= 2012–13 WHL season =

- League: Western Hockey League
- Sport: Ice hockey
- Duration: Regular season September 20, 2012 – March 17, 2013; Playoffs; March 21, 2013 – May 12, 2013
- Teams: 22
- TV partner(s): Shaw TV, Rogers Sportsnet, Root Sports Northwest

Regular season
- Scotty Munro Memorial Trophy: Portland Winterhawks (3)
- Season MVP: Adam Lowry (Swift Current Broncos)
- Top scorer: Brendan Leipsic (Portland Winterhawks)

Playoffs
- Playoffs MVP: Ty Rattie (Winterhawks)
- Finals champions: Portland Winterhawks (3)
- Runners-up: Edmonton Oil Kings

WHL seasons
- 2011–12 2013–14

2012–13 CHL season
- League: Canadian Hockey League
- Sport: Ice hockey
- Duration: OHL; September 2012 – March 2013; QMJHL; September 2012 – March 2013; WHL; September 2012 – March 2013
- Teams: 60
- TV partner(s): RDS, Rogers Sportsnet, Rogers TV, Shaw TV
- Season MVP: Jonathan Drouin (Halifax Mooseheads) (QMHL)
- Top scorer: Brendan Leipsic (Portland Winterhawks) (WHL)

Memorial Cup
- Finals champions: Halifax Mooseheads (QMJHL) (1st title)
- Runners-up: Portland Winterhawks (WHL)

The 2012–13 WHL season was the 47th season of the Western Hockey League (WHL). The regular season began in September 2012 and ended in March 2013. The Portland Winterhawks won their third Scotty Munro Memorial Trophy with the best record in the regular season. The playoffs began in late March 2013 and ended in mid-May 2013, with the Winterhawks defeating the Edmonton Oil Kings in a rematch of the 2012 final to win their third Ed Chynoweth Cup, their first since 1997–98, and a berth in the 2013 Memorial Cup tournament, which was held in Saskatoon, Saskatchewan. The Saskatoon Blades also participated in the Memorial Cup tournament by virtue of hosting it.

== Standings ==
Map of WHL, 2011–12 to 2018–19
East Division
Central Division
BC Division
US Division

=== Conference standings ===
Western Conference
Pos	Team	Pld	W	L	OTL	SOL	GF	GA	Pts
1	x, z – Portland Winterhawks	72	57	12	1	2	334	169	117
2	x, z – Kelowna Rockets	72	52	16	3	1	309	178	108
3	x – Kamloops Blazers	72	47	20	2	3	261	180	99
4	x – Spokane Chiefs	72	44	26	2	0	269	230	90
5	x – Tri-City Americans	72	40	27	2	3	246	227	85
6	x – Victoria Royals	72	35	30	2	5	223	252	77
7	x – Seattle Thunderbirds	72	24	38	7	3	210	286	58
8	x – Everett Silvertips	72	25	40	3	4	172	268	57
9	e – Prince George Cougars	72	21	43	2	6	177	273	50
10	e – Vancouver Giants	72	21	49	2	0	197	299	44

e – eliminated from playoff contention; x – clinched playoff spot; z – clinched division

Eastern Conference
Pos	Team	Pld	W	L	OTL	SOL	GF	GA	Pts
1	x, z – Edmonton Oil Kings	72	51	15	2	4	278	155	108
2	x, z – Saskatoon Blades	72	44	22	2	4	280	221	94
3	x – Calgary Hitmen	72	46	21	1	4	266	204	97
4	x – Red Deer Rebels	72	39	26	5	2	208	204	85
5	x – Prince Albert Raiders	72	37	28	3	4	234	233	81
6	x – Swift Current Broncos	72	36	29	3	4	206	193	79
7	x – Medicine Hat Tigers	72	36	33	2	1	243	244	75
8	x – Kootenay Ice	72	35	35	2	0	203	221	72
9	e – Lethbridge Hurricanes	72	28	34	3	7	212	253	66
10	e – Moose Jaw Warriors	72	25	36	4	7	182	249	61
11	e – Regina Pats	72	25	38	4	5	193	269	59
12	e – Brandon Wheat Kings	72	24	40	4	4	189	284	56

e – eliminated from playoff contention; x – clinched playoff spot; z – clinched division

== Statistical leaders ==
=== Scoring leaders ===
Players are listed by points, then goals.

Note: GP = Games played; G = Goals; A = Assists; Pts. = Points; PIM = Penalty minutes

Player	Team	GP	G	A	Pts.	PIM
Brendan Leipsic	Portland Winterhawks	68	49	71	120	103
Nic Petan	Portland Winterhawks	71	46	74	120	43
Ty Rattie	Portland Winterhawks	62	48	62	110	27
Justin Feser	Tri-City Americans	72	44	62	106	57
Colin Smith	Kamloops Blazers	72	41	65	106	72
Myles Bell	Kelowna Rockets	69	38	55	93	68
Michael St. Croix	Edmonton Oil Kings	72	37	55	92	36
Curtis Valk	Medicine Hat Tigers	71	46	45	91	54
Tim Bozon	Kamloops Blazers	69	36	55	91	58
Cody Sylvester	Calgary Hitmen	68	41	49	90	49

=== Leading goaltenders ===
These are the goaltenders that lead the league in GAA that played at least 1440 minutes.

Note: GP = Games played; Mins = Minutes played; W = Wins; L = Losses; OTL = Overtime losses; SOL = Shootout losses; SO = Shutouts; GAA = Goals against average; Sv% = Save percentage

Player	Team	GP	Mins	W	L	OTL	SOL	SO	GAA	Sv%
Tristan Jarry	Edmonton Oil Kings	27	1495	18	7	0	0	6	1.61	.936
Mac Carruth	Portland Winterhawks	39	2275	30	7	0	2	7	2.06	.929
Laurent Brossoit	Edmonton Oil Kings	49	2854	33	8	2	4	5	2.25	.917
Patrik Bartošák	Red Deer Rebels	55	3134	33	14	5	0	5	2.26	.935
Cole Cheveldave	Kamloops Blazers	56	3276	36	16	1	1	6	2.38	.908

== 2013 WHL Playoffs ==
Conference Quarterfinals	Conference Semifinals
1	Edmonton	4
8	Kootenay	1
1	Edmonton	4
7	Medicine Hat	0
2	Saskatoon	0
7	Medicine Hat	4
Eastern
3	Calgary	4
6	Swift Current	1
3	Calgary	4
4	Red Deer	1
4	Red Deer	4
5	Prince Albert	0
Note: Pairings are re-seeded after the first round.
1	Portland	4
8	Everett	2
1	Portland	4
4	Spokane	0
2	Kelowna	4
7	Seattle	3
Western
3	Kamloops	4
6	Victoria	2
2	Kelowna	0
3	Kamloops	4
4	Spokane	4
5	Tri-City	1

Conference Finals
1	Edmonton	4
3	Calgary	3
1	Portland	4
3	Kamloops	1

WHL Championship
E1	Edmonton	2
W1	Portland	4

== Conference Quarter-finals ==
=== Eastern Conference ===
==== (1) Edmonton Oil Kings vs. (8) Kootenay Ice ====
March 22	Edmonton Oil Kings	9 – 0	Kootenay Ice	Rexall Place	Recap
8:26 - Stephane Legault (1); 10:06 - Stephane Legault (2); 11:23 - Travis Ewanyk (1); 16:30 - pp - Stephane Legault (3); 19:42 - Trevor Cheek (1)		First period	No scoring
3:03 - Michael St. Croix (1); 9:24 - pp - Cody Corbett (1); 16:44 - pp - Keegan Lowe (1)		Second period	No scoring
5:36 - Trevor Cheek (2)		Third period	No scoring
Laurent Brossoit (28 saves / 28 shots)		Goalie stats	Mackenzie Skapski (10 saves / 15 shots); Wyatt Hoflin (20 saves / 24 shots)

March 24	Edmonton Oil Kings	1 – 2	OT	Kootenay Ice	Rexall Place	Recap
No scoring		First period		No scoring
No scoring		Second period		No scoring
12:01 - Michael St. Croix (2)		Third period		Brock Montgomery (1) - 10:34
No scoring		First overtime period		Luke Philp (1) - 14:56
Laurent Brossoit (24 saves / 26 shots)		Goalie stats		Mackenzie Skapski (47 saves / 48 shots)

March 26	Kootenay Ice	1 – 7	Edmonton Oil Kings	Western Financial Place	Recap
3:24 - Luke Philp (2)		First period	Michael St. Croix (3) - 1:50; Curtis Lazar (1) - 4:13; Michael St. Croix (4) - 6:14
No scoring		Second period	Luke Bertolucci (1) - 14:15
No scoring		Third period	Griffin Reinhart (1) - pp - 5:00; Trevor Cheek (3) - 8:39; Cole Benson (1) - 12:55
Mackenzie Skapski (27 saves / 32 shots); Wyatt Hoflin (5 saves / 7 shots)		Goalie stats	Laurent Brossoit (24 saves / 25 shots)

March 27	Kootenay Ice	0 – 4	Edmonton Oil Kings	Western Financial Place	Recap
No scoring		First period	Henrik Samuelsson (1) - 6:52
No scoring		Second period	Curtis Lazar (2) - pp - 6:34; Edgars Kulda (1) - pp - 19:34
No scoring		Third period	Griffin Reinhart (2) - en - 19:08
Mackenzie Skapski (23 saves / 26 shots)		Goalie stats	Laurent Brossoit (20 saves / 20 shots)

March 29	Edmonton Oil Kings	4 – 1	Kootenay Ice	Rexall Place	Recap
13:07 - Luke Bertolucci (2)		First period	No scoring
11:35 - Curtis Lazar (3)		Second period	Jakub Prochazka (1) - 2:51
16:52 - Stephane Legault (4); 18:12 - en - Curtis Lazar (4)		Third period	No scoring
Laurent Brossoit (24 saves / 25 shots)		Goalie stats	Mackenzie Skapski (32 saves / 35 shots)

Edmonton wins series 4 – 1

==== (2) Saskatoon Blades vs. (7) Medicine Hat Tigers ====
March 21	Saskatoon Blades	1 – 4	Medicine Hat Tigers	Credit Union Centre	Recap
No scoring		First period	Trevor Cox (1) - 11:55; Hunter Shinkaruk (1) - 19:03
17:50 - pp - Shane McColgan (1)		Second period	No scoring
No scoring		Third period	Elgin Pearce (1) - 6:17; Dylan Bredo (1) - en - 19:47
Andrey Makarov (29 saves / 32 shots)		Goalie stats	Cam Lanigan (42 saves / 43 shots)

March 22	Saskatoon Blades	0 – 3	Medicine Hat Tigers	Credit Union Centre	Recap
No scoring		First period	No scoring
No scoring		Second period	Trevor Cox (2) - pp - 3:32
No scoring		Third period	Miles Koules (1) - 7:10; Tyler Lewington (1) - en - 18:45
Andrey Makarov (40 saves / 42 shots)		Goalie stats	Cam Lanigan (42 saves / 42 shots)

March 26	Medicine Hat Tigers	5 – 2	Saskatoon Blades	Medicine Hat Arena	Recap
3:08 - Curtis Valk (1); 5:01 - Kyle Becker (1); 13:25 - Steven Owre (1); 17:44 - pp - Logan McVeigh (1)		First period	No scoring
2:23 - pp - Hunter Shinkaruk (2)		Second period	Lukas Sutter (1) - 7:53; Darren Dietz (1) - 10:46
No scoring		Third period	No scoring
Cam Lanigan (42 saves / 44 shots)		Goalie stats	Andrey Makarov (10 saves / 14 shots); Alex Moodie (19 saves / 20 shots)

March 27	Medicine Hat Tigers	3 – 1	Saskatoon Blades	Medicine Hat Arena	Recap
4:23 - pp - Curtis Valk (2)		First period	No scoring
2:39 - Cole Sanford (1); 6:01 - Boston Leier (1)		Second period	No scoring
No scoring		Third period	Lukas Sutter (2) - 7:36
Cam Lanigan (36 saves / 37 shots)		Goalie stats	Andrey Makarov (25 saves / 28 shots)

Medicine Hat wins series 4 – 0

==== (3) Calgary Hitmen vs. (6) Swift Current Broncos ====
March 21	Calgary Hitmen	6 – 5	OT	Swift Current Broncos	Scotiabank Saddledome	Recap
0:34 - pp - Brooks Macek (1); 19:05 - Brady Brassart (1)		First period		No scoring
5:33 - Colten Mayor (1); 5:49 - Brady Brassart (2)		Second period		Adam Lowry (1) - 10:23; Ryon Moser (1) - 11:14; Levi Bews (1) - pp - 12:29
3:47 - Brady Brassart (3)		Third period		Coda Gordon (1) - 4:20; Graham Black (1) - pp - 13:53
4:32 - Alex Roach (1)		First overtime period		No scoring
Chris Driedger (23 saves / 28 shots)		Goalie stats		Eetu Laurikainen (32 saves / 38 shots)

March 22	Calgary Hitmen	3 – 1	Swift Current Broncos	Scotiabank Saddledome	Recap
No scoring		First period	No scoring
11:20 - Cody Sylvester (1); 15:50 - Greg Chase (1)		Second period	No scoring
5:27 - Victor Rask (1)		Third period	Adam Lowry (2) - pp - 10:27
Chris Driedger (39 saves / 40 shots)		Goalie stats	Eetu Laurikainen (20 saves / 23 shots)

March 25	Swift Current Broncos	3 – 2	OT	Calgary Hitmen	Credit Union iPlex	Recap
No scoring		First period		Cody Sylvester (2) - 15:18
12:38 - pp - Adam Lowry (3)		Second period		No scoring
5:37 - Colby Cave (1)		Third period		Cody Sylvester (3) - pp - 19:27
10:14 - Colby Cave (2)		First overtime period		No scoring
Eetu Laurikainen (43 saves / 45 shots)		Goalie stats		Chris Driedger (39 saves / 42 shots)

March 26	Swift Current Broncos	0 – 1	OT	Calgary Hitmen	Credit Union iPlex	Recap
No scoring		First period		No scoring
No scoring		Second period		No scoring
No scoring		Third period		No scoring
No scoring		First overtime period		Victor Rask (2) - 0:37
Eetu Laurikainen (26 saves / 27 shots)		Goalie stats		Chris Driedger (28 saves / 28 shots)

March 28	Calgary Hitmen	3 – 1	Swift Current Broncos	Scotiabank Saddledome	Recap
15:04 - Jake Virtanen (1)		First period	Coda Gordon (2) - pp - 11:24
12:07 - Victor Rask (3); 17:48 - Elliott Peterson (1)		Second period	No scoring
No scoring		Third period	No scoring
Chris Driedger (34 saves / 35 shots)		Goalie stats	Eetu Laurikainen (23 saves / 26 shots)

Calgary wins series 4 – 1

==== (4) Red Deer Rebels vs (5) Prince Albert Raiders ====
March 22	Red Deer Rebels	3 – 0	Prince Albert Raiders	ENMAX Centrium	Recap
0:25 - Brooks Maxwell (1); 19:04 - Rhyse Dieno (1)		First period	No scoring
No scoring		Second period	No scoring
18:35 - Cody Thiel (1)		Third period	No scoring
Patrik Bartošák (31 saves / 31 shots)		Goalie stats	Luke Siemens (27 saves / 30 shots)

March 23	Red Deer Rebels	3 – 2	Prince Albert Raiders	ENMAX Centrium	Recap
2:35 - Cody Thiel (2)		First period	No scoring
0:47 - pp - Matt Dumba (1); 6:25 - Rhyse Dieno (2)		Second period	Jonas Knutsen (1) - 14:15
No scoring		Third period	Shane Danyluk (1) - 10:05
Patrik Bartošák (36 saves / 38 shots)		Goalie stats	Luke Siemens (38 saves / 41 shots)

March 26	Prince Albert Raiders	1 – 3	Red Deer Rebels	Art Hauser Centre	Recap
No scoring		First period	No scoring
No scoring		Second period	Brooks Maxwell (2) - 4:10; Turner Elson (1) - pp - 7:34
16:57 - Mike Winther (1)		Third period	Turner Elson (2) - en - 19:16
Luke Siemens (23 saves / 25 shots)		Goalie stats	Patrik Bartošák (29 saves / 30 shots)

March 27	Prince Albert Raiders	2 – 3	Red Deer Rebels	Art Hauser Centre	Recap
5:19 - Mark McNeill (1); 8:45 - pp - Jayden Hart (1)		First period	Conner Bleackley (1) - 12:02
No scoring		Second period	Brooks Maxwell (3) - 13:05
No scoring		Third period	Turner Elson (3) - 10:51
Luke Siemens (34 saves / 37 shots)		Goalie stats	Patrik Bartošák (29 saves / 31 shots)

Red Deer wins series 4 – 0

=== Western Conference ===
==== (1) Portland Winterhawks vs. (8) Everett Silvertips ====
March 22	Portland Winterhawks	3 – 4	Everett Silvertips	Rose Garden	Recap
9:34 - pp - Chase De Leo (1)		First period	No scoring
No scoring		Second period	Carson Stadnyk (1) - 3:07; Joshua Winquist (1) - 17:05
9:37 - Ty Rattie (1); 19:44 - pp - Nic Petan (1)		Third period	Kohl Bauml (1) - 3:25; Kohl Bauml (2) - 12:46
Mac Carruth (27 saves / 31 shots)		Goalie stats	Austin Lotz (55 saves / 58 shots)

March 23	Portland Winterhawks	4 – 1	Everett Silvertips	Rose Garden	Recap
6:34 - Troy Rutkowski (1)		First period	No scoring
8:04 - Shaun MacPherson (1)		Second period	No scoring
6:43 - Ty Rattie (2); 16:45 - pp - Derrick Pouliot (1)		Third period	Joshua Winquist (2) - pp - 10:48
Mac Carruth (10 saves / 11 shots)		Goalie stats	Austin Lotz (30 saves / 34 shots)

March 27	Everett Silvertips	3 – 7	Portland Winterhawks	Comcast Arena at Everett	Recap
3:50 - Dawson Leedahl (1)		First period	Nic Petan (2) - pp - 14:41
No scoring		Second period	Ty Rattie (3) - 3:15; Nic Petan (3) - 6:31; Troy Rutkowski (2) - pp - 10:25; Oliver Bjorkstrand (1) - 19:50
6:25 - Joshua Winquist (3); 6:46 - Dawson Leedahl (2)		Third period	Derrick Pouliot (2) - 7:34; Brendan Leipsic (1) - pp - 9:08
Austin Lotz (19 saves / 24 shots); Daniel Cotton (4 saves / 6 shots)		Goalie stats	Mac Carruth (10 saves / 13 shots)

March 29	Everett Silvertips	4 – 11	Portland Winterhawks	Comcast Arena at Everett	Recap
14:51 - Joshua Winquist (4)		First period	Ty Rattie (4) - 8:02; Brendan Leipsic (2) - pp - 11:47; Chase De Leo (2) - pp - 12:29; Brendan Leipsic (3) - 13:42; Tyler Wotherspoon (1) - 18:03
1:56 - pp - Joshua Winquist (5)		Second period	Ty Rattie (5) - 6:42; Ty Rattie (6) - 14:51; Tyler Wotherspoon (2) - 16:54
13:07 - Cole MacDonald (1); 18:06 - Reid Petryk (1)		Third period	Joey Baker (1) - 12:02; Taylor Leier (1) - 14:24; Josh Hanson (1) - pp - 18:49
Austin Lotz (21 saves / 29 shots); Daniel Cotton (6 saves / 9 shots)		Goalie stats	Mac Carruth (16 saves / 18 shots); Brendan Burke (3 saves / 5 shots)

March 30	Portland Winterhawks	2 – 3	Everett Silvertips	Rose Garden	Recap
No scoring		First period	Joshua Winquist (6) - 10:19; Logan Aasman (1) - 13:41
No scoring		Second period	Reid Petryk (2) - 13:26
5:59 - pp - Brendan Leipsic (4); 18:35 - pp - Derrick Pouliot (3)		Third period	No scoring
Mac Carruth (15 saves / 18 shots)		Goalie stats	Austin Lotz (43 saves / 45 shots)

April 1	Everett Silvertips	1 – 5	Portland Winterhawks	Comcast Arena at Everett	Recap
2:14 - Reid Petryk (3)		First period	Seth Jones (1) - 7:16; Oliver Bjorkstrand (2) - 14:58
No scoring		Second period	Oliver Bjorkstrand (3) - pp - 15:14; Seth Jones (2) - pp - 18:43
No scoring		Third period	Taylor Leier (2) - 3:47
Austin Lotz (47 saves / 52 shots)		Goalie stats	Mac Carruth (12 saves / 13 shots)

Portland wins series 4 – 2

==== (2) Kelowna Rockets vs. (7) Seattle Thunderbirds ====
March 22	Kelowna Rockets	4 – 5	OT	Seattle Thunderbirds	Prospera Place	Recap
5:52 - Damon Severson (1); 18:48 - Dylen McKinlay (1)		First period		Riley Sheen (1) - 13:33
19:02 - pp - Tyson Baillie (1)		Second period		Roberts Lipsbergs (1) - 4:03; Jesse Forsberg (1) - 10:33
0:59 - Myles Bell (1)		Third period		Luke Lockhart (1) - 13:30
No scoring		First overtime period		Luke Lockhart (2) - 19:09
Jordon Cooke (45 saves / 50 shots)		Goalie stats		Brandon Glover (35 saves / 39 shots)

March 23	Kelowna Rockets	1 – 2	OT	Seattle Thunderbirds	Prospera Place	Recap
No scoring		First period		No scoring
13:28 - Cole Linaker (1)		Second period		No scoring
No scoring		Third period		Jared Hauf (1) - 10:08
No scoring		First overtime period		Alexander Delnov (1) - 2:41
Jordon Cooke (17 saves / 19 shots)		Goalie stats		Brandon Glover (21 saves / 22 shots)

March 26	Seattle Thunderbirds	3 – 2	OT	Kelowna Rockets	ShoWare Center	Recap
15:25 - Roberts Lipsbergs (2)		First period		Zach Franko (1) - pp - 3:06; Cody Fowlie (1) - 6:10
19:35 - Jesse Forsberg (2)		Second period		No scoring
No scoring		Third period		No scoring
4:55 - Evan Wardley (1)		First overtime period		No scoring
Brandon Glover (33 saves / 35 shots)		Goalie stats		Jordon Cooke (27 saves / 30 shots)

March 27	Seattle Thunderbirds	0 – 4	Kelowna Rockets	ShoWare Center	Recap
No scoring		First period	Tyson Baillie (2) - pp - 10:09; Tyson Baillie (3) - pp - 11:24; Myles Bell (2) - 13:45
No scoring		Second period	No scoring
No scoring		Third period	Zach Franko (2) - 13:36
Brandon Glover (33 saves / 37 shots)		Goalie stats	Jordon Cooke (25 saves / 25 shots)

March 30	Kelowna Rockets	4 – 3	Seattle Thunderbirds	Prospera Place	Recap
10:50 - pp - Tyson Baillie (4); 11:31 - Colton Heffley (1)		First period	No scoring
12:20 - Dylen McKinlay (2)		Second period	Alexander Delnov (2) - 13:26
13:49 - Myles Bell (3)		Third period	Seth Swenson (1) - 19:23; Roberts Lipsbergs (3) - 19:34
Jordon Cooke (14 saves / 17 shots)		Goalie stats	Brandon Glover (23 saves / 27 shots)

April 2	Seattle Thunderbirds	3 – 4	OT	Kelowna Rockets	ShoWare Center	Recap
2:40 - Connor Sanvido (1); 8:33 - Adam Kambeitz (1); 9:23 - Luke Lockhart (3)		First period		Cody Fowlie (2) - 0:22; Tyrell Goulbourne (1) - 14:56; Cody Fowlie (3) - 16:20
No scoring		Second period		No scoring
No scoring		Third period		No scoring
No scoring		First overtime period		Myles Bell (4) - 10:39
Brandon Glover (55 saves / 59 shots)		Goalie stats		Jordon Cooke (40 saves / 43 shots)

April 3	Kelowna Rockets	3 – 2	OT	Seattle Thunderbirds	Prospera Place	Recap
No scoring		First period		No scoring
9:17 - Tyson Baillie (5); 13:09 - Tyson Baillie (6)		Second period		Evan Wardley (2) - 9:04
No scoring		Third period		Luke Lockhart (4) - 19:53
5:10 - Tyson Baillie (7)		First overtime period		No scoring
Jordon Cooke (24 saves / 26 shots)		Goalie stats		Brandon Glover (32 saves / 35 shots)

Kelowna win series 4 – 3

==== (3) Kamloops Blazers vs. (6) Victoria Royals ====
March 22	Kamloops Blazers	3 – 2	Victoria Royals	Interior Savings Centre	Recap
12:59 - pp - Kale Kessy (1)		First period	Steven Hodges (1) - 12:25
17:44 - pp - JC Lipon (1)		Second period	Steven Hodges (2) - pp - 18:48
4:37 - JC Lipon (2)		Third period	No scoring
Cole Cheveldave (22 saves / 24 shots)		Goalie stats	Patrik Polívka (33 saves / 36 shots)

March 23	Kamloops Blazers	6 – 4	Victoria Royals	Interior Savings Centre	Recap
13:17 - Joel Edmundson (1); 18:46 - pp - Joel Edmundson (2)		First period	No scoring
12:43 - Tim Bozon (1); 13:40 - sh - Brendan Ranford (1); 16:43 - Tim Bozon (2)		Second period	Jamie Crooks (1) - pp - 11:49
18:52 - en - Dylan Willick (1)		Third period	Tyler Soy (1) - 7:44; Austin Carroll (1) - pp - 16:10; Brandon Magee (1) - 18:16
Cole Cheveldave (20 saves / 24 shots)		Goalie stats	Patrik Polívka (23 saves / 28 shots)

March 26	Victoria Royals	2 – 1	Kamloops Blazers	Bear Mountain Arena	Recap
18:23 - Ben Walker (1)		First period	No scoring
No scoring		Second period	JC Lipon (3) - pp - 12:52
0:50 - Tim Traber (1)		Third period	No scoring
Patrik Polívka (39 saves / 40 shots)		Goalie stats	Cole Cheveldave (26 saves / 28 shots)

March 28	Victoria Royals	4 – 5	OT	Kamloops Blazers	Bear Mountain Arena	Recap
4:01 - Jamie Crooks (2); 10:38 - pp - Logan Nelson (1)		First period		Kale Kessy (2) - 19:42
3:17 - Brandon Fushimi (1); 9:03 - pp - Ben Walker (2)		Second period		Kale Kessy (3) - 1:22; Kale Kessy (4) - 7:16
No scoring		Third period		Marek Hrbas (1) - 15:42
No scoring		First overtime period		Dylan Willick (2) - 17:47
Patrik Polívka (43 saves / 48 shots)		Goalie stats		Cole Cheveldave (20 saves / 24 shots)

March 30	Kamloops Blazers	2 – 4	Victoria Royals	Interior Savings Centre	Recap
No scoring		First period	Jamie Crooks (3) - 8:03
1:28 - Chase Souto (1); 11:54 - pp - Colin Smith (1)		Second period	Brett Cote (1) - 19:21
No scoring		Third period	Brett Cote (2) - 11:25; Logan Nelson (2) - en - 19:25
Cole Cheveldave (21 saves / 24 shots)		Goalie stats	Patrik Polívka (47 saves / 49 shots)

April 1	Victoria Royals	2 – 6	Kamloops Blazers	Bear Mountain Arena	Recap
No scoring		First period	Cole Ully (1) - 3:45; Kale Kessy (5) - 17:09
7:08 - pp - Ben Walker (3); 15:23 - pp - Keegan Kanzig (1)		Second period	Kale Kessy (6) - 13:28; Sam Grist (1) - 17:30; JC Lipon (4) - 18:47
No scoring		Third period	Kale Kessy (7) - 8:50
Patrik Polívka (37 saves / 43 shots)		Goalie stats	Cole Cheveldave (16 saves / 18 shots)

Kamloops wins series 4 – 2

==== (4) Spokane Chiefs vs. (5) Tri-City Americans ====
March 22	Spokane Chiefs	4 – 1	Tri-City Americans	Spokane Veterans Memorial Arena	Recap
1:08 - Blake Gal (1); 11:15 - Alessio Bertaggia (1); 13:39 - pp - Mitch Holmberg (1)		First period	Brandon Carlo (1) - 6:36
No scoring		Second period	No scoring
12:26 - Mitch Holmberg (2)		Third period	No scoring
Eric Williams (26 saves / 27 shots)		Goalie stats	Troy Trombley (28 saves / 32 shots)

March 23	Spokane Chiefs	6 – 4	Tri-City Americans	Spokane Veterans Memorial Arena	Recap
6:59 - Ryan Hofer (1); 7:32 - Tyler King (1)		First period	Drydn Dow (1) - 5:24; Parker Bowles (1) - 8:27; Marcus Messier (1) - 10:51
4:11 - Blake Gal (2); 14:00 - Todd Fiddler (1)		Second period	No scoring
16:31 - Blake Gal (3); 18:11 - Mike Aviani (1)		Third period	Jesse Mychan (1) - pp - 8:41
Eric Williams (15 saves / 19 shots)		Goalie stats	Troy Trombley (24 saves / 30 shots)

March 26	Tri-City Americans	5 – 4	OT	Spokane Chiefs	Toyota Center	Recap
7:11 - Parker Bowles (2)		First period		Mike Aviani (2) - sh - 3:56; Mitch Holmberg (3) - pp - 12:55; Blake Gal (4) - sh - 17:27
10:38 - Marcus Messier (2); 12:00 - Justin Feser (1); 18:06 - pp - Drydn Dow (2)		Second period		Ryan Hofer (2) - 6:34
No scoring		Third period		No scoring
10:46 - Connor Rankin (1)		First overtime period		No scoring
Luke Lee-Knight (34 saves / 38 shots)		Goalie stats		Eric Williams (38 saves / 43 shots)

March 28	Tri-City Americans	3 – 4	OT	Spokane Chiefs	Toyota Center	Recap
9:25 - Justin Feser (2)		First period		Adam Helewka (1) - 15:38; Todd Fiddler (2) - 19:20
No scoring		Second period		No scoring
14:50 - pp - Mitch Topping (1); 17:17 - Drydn Dow (3)		Third period		Brenden Kichton (1) - 6:35
No scoring		First overtime period		Blake Gal (5) - 5:10
Luke Lee-Knight (41 saves / 44 shots); Troy Trombley (2 saves / 3 shots)		Goalie stats		Eric Williams (29 saves / 32 shots)

March 30	Tri-City Americans	1 – 3	Spokane Chiefs	Toyota Center	Recap
No scoring		First period	14:04 - Mike Aviani (3)
No scoring		Second period	7:50 - pp - Brenden Kichton (2)
Malte Strömwall (1) - 10:38		Third period	15:09 - Alessio Bertaggia (2)
Troy Trombley (31 saves / 34 shots)		Goalie stats	Eric Williams (36 saves / 37 shots)

Spokane wins series 4 – 1

== Conference Semi-finals ==
=== Eastern Conference ===
==== (1) Edmonton Oil Kings vs. (7) Medicine Hat Tigers ====
April 5	Edmonton Oil Kings	4 – 1	Medicine Hat Tigers	Rexall Place	Recap
15:53 - Edgars Kulda (2)		First period	No scoring
6:57 - Stephane Legault (5)		Second period	No scoring
5:54 - Mitchell Moroz (1); 17:33 - Travis Ewanyk (2)		Third period	Kyle Becker (2) - 7:30
Laurent Brossoit (21 saves / 22 shots)		Goalie stats	Cam Lanigan (29 saves / 33 shots)

April 7	Edmonton Oil Kings	2 – 0	Medicine Hat Tigers	Rexall Place	Recap
6:04 - pp - Henrik Samuelsson (2)		First period	No scoring
No scoring		Second period	No scoring
1:56 - pp - Cody Corbett (2)		Third period	No scoring
Laurent Brossoit (33 saves / 33 shots)		Goalie stats	Cam Lanigan (32 saves / 34 shots)

April 9	Medicine Hat Tigers	2 – 9	Edmonton Oil Kings	Medicine Hat Arena	Recap
No scoring		First period	Henrik Samuelsson (3) - 1:39; Henrik Samuelsson (4) - pp - 12:25; Martin Gernát (1) - pp - 14:35
No scoring		Second period	Michael St. Croix (5) - 1:40; Martin Gernát (2) - 5:49; Michael St. Croix (6) - 10:36; Travis Ewanyk (3) - 16:21
2:45 - Logan McVeigh (2); 15:55 - pp - Curtis Valk (3)		Third period	Trevor Cheek (4) - 10:04; T.J. Foster (1) - 10:48
Cam Lanigan (23 saves / 27 shots); Marek Langhamer (25 saves / 30 shots)		Goalie stats	Laurent Brossoit (25 saves / 27 shots)

April 10	Medicine Hat Tigers	2 – 4	Edmonton Oil Kings	Medicine Hat Arena	Recap
5:41 - sh - Hunter Shinkaruk (3)		First period	Trevor Cheek (5) - 12:36
8:06 - pp - Boston Leier (2)		Second period	No scoring
No scoring		Third period	Henrik Samuelsson (5) - 12:40; Griffin Reinhart (3) - 13:19; Henrik Samuelsson (6) - sh - en - 19:04
Cam Lanigan (38 saves / 41 shots)		Goalie stats	Laurent Brossoit (32 saves / 34 shots)

Edmonton wins series 4 – 0

==== (3) Calgary Hitmen vs. (4) Red Deer Rebels ====
April 4	Calgary Hitmen	4 – 2	Red Deer Rebels	Scotiabank Saddledome	Recap
11:55 - Brady Brassart (4)		First period	No scoring
1:21 - pp - Alex Roach (2); 6:24 - Brady Brassart (5); 9:19 - pp - Brady Brassart (6)		Second period	Dominik Volek (1) - 1:57
No scoring		Third period	Turner Elson (4) - 7:02
Chris Driedger (28 saves / 30 shots)		Goalie stats	Patrik Bartošák (29 saves / 33 shots)

April 5	Calgary Hitmen	2 – 1	Red Deer Rebels	Scotiabank Saddledome	Recap
0:47 - Elliott Peterson (2)		First period	Jordan DePape (1) - 17:30
16:43 - Victor Rask (4)		Second period	No scoring
No scoring		Third period	No scoring
Chris Driedger (29 saves / 30 shots)		Goalie stats	Patrik Bartošák (40 saves / 42 shots)

April 8	Red Deer Rebels	2 – 1	OT	Calgary Hitmen	ENMAX Centrium	Recap
14:29 - sh - Brooks Maxwell (4)		First period		Peter Kosterman (1) - 7:05
No scoring		Second period		No scoring
No scoring		Third period		No scoring
6:33 - pp - Matt Dumba (2)		First overtime period		No scoring
Patrik Bartošák (38 saves / 39 shots)		Goalie stats		Chris Driedger (42 saves / 44 shots)

April 9	Red Deer Rebels	2 – 3	OT	Calgary Hitmen	ENMAX Centrium	Recap
No scoring		First period		Jake Virtanen (2) - pp - 7:17; Brooks Macek (2) - 13:00
2:32 - pp - Dominik Volek (2); 5:19 - pp - Conner Bleackley (2)		Second period		No scoring
No scoring		Third period		No scoring
No scoring		First overtime period		Cody Sylvester (4) - 5:10
Patrik Bartošák (28 saves / 31 shots)		Goalie stats		Chris Driedger (37 saves / 39 shots)

April 11	Calgary Hitmen	5 – 1	Red Deer Rebels	Scotiabank Saddledome	Recap
2:32 - Greg Chase (2); 10:37 - Zane Jones (1)		First period	Turner Elson (5) - 3:33
4:32 - pp - Calder Brooks (1)		Second period	No scoring
17:58 - sh - en - Spencer Humphries (1); 18:40 - sh - en - Elliott Peterson (3)		Third period	No scoring
Chris Driedger (16 saves / 17 shots)		Goalie stats	Patrik Bartošák (29 saves / 32 shots)

Calgary wins series 4 – 1

=== Western Conference ===
==== (1) Portland Winterhawks vs. (4) Spokane Chiefs ====
April 5	Portland Winterhawks	7 – 2	Spokane Chiefs	Memorial Coliseum	Recap
5:46 - Taylor Leier (3)		First period	Mike Aviani (4) - 9:04
4:05 - Oliver Bjorkstrand (4); 14:44 - Oliver Bjorkstrand (5); 17:23 - Derrick Pouliot (4)		Second period	Todd Fiddler (3) - sh - 7:23
0:47 - pp - Ty Rattie (7); 5:28 - Ty Rattie (8); 16:23 - pp - Ty Rattie (9)		Third period	No scoring
Mac Carruth (38 saves / 40 shots)		Goalie stats	Eric Williams (32 saves / 39 shots)

April 6	Portland Winterhawks	3 – 0	Spokane Chiefs	Memorial Coliseum	Recap
13:17 - Chase De Leo (3)		First period	No scoring
1:05 - Nic Petan (4)		Second period	No scoring
9:02 - Brendan Leipsic (5)		Third period	No scoring
Mac Carruth (27 saves / 27 shots)		Goalie stats	Eric Williams (40 saves / 43 shots)

April 9	Spokane Chiefs	1 – 3	Portland Winterhawks	Spokane Veterans Memorial Arena	Recap
No scoring		First period	Ty Rattie (10) - 19:13
16:24 - pp - Blake Gal (6)		Second period	Nic Petan (5) - 8:01
No scoring		Third period	Taylor Leier (4) - en - 19:45
Eric Williams (33 saves / 35 shots)		Goalie stats	Mac Carruth (25 saves / 26 shots)

April 10	Spokane Chiefs	0 – 5	Portland Winterhawks	Spokane Veterans Memorial Arena	Recap
No scoring		First period	Chase De Leo (4) - 10:53; Taylor Peters (1) - sh - 13:05
No scoring		Second period	Ty Rattie (11) - pp - 1:42
No scoring		Third period	Joey Baker (2) - 10:55; Taylor Leier (5) - 16:31
Eric Williams (30 saves / 35 shots)		Goalie stats	Mac Carruth (30 saves / 30 shots)

Portland wins series 4 – 0

==== (2) Kelowna Rockets vs. (3) Kamloops Blazers ====
April 6	Kelowna Rockets	2 – 4	Kamloops Blazers	Prospera Place	Recap
No scoring		First period	Brendan Ranford (2) - 0:30; Aaron Macklin (1) - pp - 9:28; Brendan Ranford (3) - pp - 16:31
6:02 - Henrik Nyberg (1); 16:04 - Cole Linaker (2)		Second period	No scoring
No scoring		Third period	Chase Souto (2) - 12:28
Jordon Cooke (29 saves / 33 shots)		Goalie stats	Cole Cheveldave (21 saves / 23 shots)

April 7	Kelowna Rockets	1 – 5	Kamloops Blazers	Prospera Place	Recap
1:35 - pp - Myles Bell (5)		First period	Brendan Ranford (4) - 3:11
No scoring		Second period	Dylan Willick (3) - pp - 9:47
No scoring		Third period	Chase Souto (3) - 5:06; Kale Kessy (8) - 12:02; Aaron Macklin (2) - 18:48
Jordon Cooke (33 saves / 38 shots)		Goalie stats	Cole Cheveldave (29 saves / 30 shots)

April 9	Kamloops Blazers	5 – 4	OT	Kelowna Rockets	Interior Savings Centre	Recap
11:41 - pp - Brendan Ranford (5); 16:37 - Dylan Willick (4); 18:14 - Kale Kessy (9)		First period		J.T. Barnett (1) - 14:15; Ryan Olsen (1) - sh - 15:55
9:53 - Dylan Willick (5)		Second period		J.T. Barnett (2) - 3:57; Cole Martin (1) - 5:25
No scoring		Third period		No scoring
3:43 - JC Lipon (5)		First overtime period		No scoring
Cole Cheveldave (33 saves / 37 shots)		Goalie stats		Jordon Cooke (8 saves / 11 shots); Jackson Whistle (16 saves / 18 shots)

April 10	Kamloops Blazers	4 – 3	OT	Kelowna Rockets	Interior Savings Centre	Recap
15:04 - pp - Kale Kessy (10)		First period		No scoring
17:05 - Marek Hrbas (2); 19:32 - pp - Matt Needham (1)		Second period		Tyson Baillie (8) - 12:38
No scoring		Third period		J.T. Barnett (3) - 5:03; Cole Linaker (3) - 9:24
2:24 - pp - Kale Kessy (11)		First overtime period		No scoring
Cole Cheveldave (22 saves / 25 shots)		Goalie stats		Jordon Cooke (41 saves / 45 shots)

Kamloops wins series 4 – 0

== Conference Finals ==
=== Eastern Conference ===
==== (1) Edmonton Oil Kings vs. (3) Calgary Hitmen ====
April 18	Edmonton Oil Kings	2 – 3	OT	Calgary Hitmen	Rexall Place	Recap
No scoring		First period		Victor Rask (5) - 1:25
13:42 - Trevor Cheek (6)		Second period		Zane Jones (2) - pp - 3:32
13:05 - pp - Henrik Samuelsson (7)		Third period		No scoring
No scoring		First overtime period		Brady Brassart (7) - 1:44
Laurent Brossoit (16 saves / 19 shots)		Goalie stats		Chris Driedger (33 saves / 35 shots)

April 19	Edmonton Oil Kings	6 – 0	Calgary Hitmen	Rexall Place	Recap
6:13 - Henrik Samuelsson (8)		First period	No scoring
No scoring		Second period	No scoring
8:55 - pp - Martin Gernát (3); 14:32 - pp - Martin Gernát (4); 14:58 - pp - Curtis Lazar (5); 18:36 - pp - Ashton Sautner (1); 19:50 - Trevor Cheek (7)		Third period	No scoring
Laurent Brossoit (23 saves / 23 shots)		Goalie stats	Chris Driedger (40 saves / 44 shots); Mack Shields (4 saves / 6 shots)

April 23	Calgary Hitmen	5 – 2	Edmonton Oil Kings	Scotiabank Saddledome	Recap
No scoring		First period	Trevor Cheek (8) - pp - 6:29
0:24 - Greg Chase (3); 8:11 - pp - Brady Brassart (8); 8:51 - Elliott Peterson (4); 12:46 - pp - Calder Brooks (2); 13:15 - Victor Rask (6)		Second period	No scoring
No scoring		Third period	Curtis Lazar (6) - pp - 7:28
Chris Driedger (32 saves / 34 shots)		Goalie stats	Laurent Brossoit (21 saves / 26 shots); Tristan Jarry (3 saves / 3 shots)

April 24	Calgary Hitmen	3 – 7	Edmonton Oil Kings	Scotiabank Saddledome	Recap
12:16 - pp - Calder Brooks (3)		First period	T.J. Foster (2) - 1:15; T.J. Foster (3) - pp - 2:10; Martin Gernát (5) - 5:33; Ashton Sautner (2) - 10:15; Travis Ewanyk (4) - 18:09
7:56 - ps - Brooks Macek (3); 13:45 - Elliott Peterson (5)		Second period	Dylan Wruck (1) - 10:53
No scoring		Third period	Michael St. Croix (7) - 1:30
Chris Driedger (12 saves / 17 shots); Mack Shields (20 saves / 22 shots)		Goalie stats	Laurent Brossoit (22 saves / 25 shots)

April 26	Edmonton Oil Kings	5 – 1	Calgary Hitmen	Rexall Place	Recap
7:38 - Martin Gernát (6); 18:13 - Henrik Samuelsson (9); 18:57 - Travis Ewanyk (5)		First period	No scoring
No scoring		Second period	No scoring
13:27 - Michael St. Croix (8); 15:43 - en - Curtis Lazar (7)		Third period	Brooks Macek (4) - pp - 15:04
Laurent Brossoit (28 saves / 29 shots)		Goalie stats	Chris Driedger (35 saves / 39 shots)

April 28	Calgary Hitmen	4 – 3	OT	Edmonton Oil Kings	Scotiabank Saddledome	Recap
No scoring		First period		Ashton Sautner (3) - 13:27; Curtis Lazar (8) - 17:04
4:47 - Spencer Humphries (2)		Second period		Stephane Legault (6) - 15:47
0:07 - Brady Brassart (9); 7:56 - pp - Brooks Macek (5)		Third period		No scoring
6:59 - Brooks Macek (6)		First overtime period		No scoring
Chris Driedger (36 saves / 39 shots)		Goalie stats		Laurent Brossoit (32 saves / 36 shots)

April 30	Edmonton Oil Kings	2 – 0	Calgary Hitmen	Rexall Place	Recap
14:05 - Michael St. Croix (9)		First period	No scoring
4:33 - Michael St. Croix (10)		Second period	No scoring
No scoring		Third period	No scoring
Laurent Brossoit (26 saves / 26 shots)		Goalie stats	Chris Driedger (36 saves / 38 shots)

Edmonton wins series 4 – 3

=== Western Conference ===
==== (1) Portland Winterhawks vs. (3) Kamloops Blazers ====
April 19	Portland Winterhawks	4 – 1	Kamloops Blazers	Memorial Coliseum	Recap
15:03 - Taylor Leier (6); 17:16 - sh - ps - Ty Rattie (12)		First period	Joe Kornelsen (1) - 2:10
No scoring		Second period	No scoring
3:17 - pp - Troy Rutkowski (3); 14:00 - Brendan Leipsic (6)		Third period	No scoring
Mac Carruth (33 saves / 34 shots)		Goalie stats	Cole Cheveldave (37 saves / 41 shots)

April 20	Portland Winterhawks	4 – 0	Kamloops Blazers	Memorial Coliseum	Recap
15:31 - Seth Jones (3)		First period	No scoring
16:08 - Ty Rattie (13)		Second period	No scoring
0:45 - pp - Nic Petan (6); 10:01 - pp - Brendan Leipsic (7)		Third period	No scoring
Mac Carruth (27 saves / 27 shots)		Goalie stats	Cole Cheveldave (30 saves / 34 shots)

April 23	Kamloops Blazers	5 – 1	Portland Winterhawks	Interior Savings Centre	Recap
16:37 - pp - Colin Smith (2)		First period	No scoring
1:06 - Joel Edmundson (3); 8:02 - Aaron Macklin (3); 14:56 - Tim Bozon (3); 17:04 - Tim Bozon (4)		Second period	No scoring
No scoring		Third period	No scoring
Cole Cheveldave (35 saves / 36 shots)		Goalie stats	Mac Carruth (24 saves / 29 shots)

April 24	Kamloops Blazers	0 – 3	Portland Winterhawks	Interior Savings Centre	Recap
No scoring		First period	Nic Petan (7) - pp - 2:09; Seth Jones (4) - 11:43
No scoring		Second period	No scoring
No scoring		Third period	Nic Petan (8) - 1:35
Cole Cheveldave (24 saves / 27 shots)		Goalie stats	Mac Carruth (29 saves / 29 shots)

April 26	Portland Winterhawks	4 – 1	Kamloops Blazers	Memorial Coliseum	Recap
7:53 - pp - Seth Jones (5)		First period	JC Lipon (6) - 19:24
4:23 - Taylor Leier (7)		Second period	No scoring
10:05 - sh - Ty Rattie (15); 13:58 - pp - Nic Petan (9)		Third period	No scoring
Mac Carruth (22 saves / 23 shots)		Goalie stats	Cole Cheveldave (37 saves / 41 shots)

Portland wins series 4 – 1

== WHL Championship ==
=== (W1) Portland Winterhawks vs. (E1) Edmonton Oil Kings ===
May 3	Portland Winterhawks	1 – 4	Edmonton Oil Kings	Rose Garden	Recap
No scoring		First period	Dylan Wruck (2) - 2:03
No scoring		Second period	Henrik Samuelsson (10) - 11:17
3:00 - Taylor Leier (8)		Third period	Henrik Samuelsson (11) - 3:47; Curtis Lazar (9) - 10:03
Mac Carruth (25 saves / 29 shots)		Goalie stats	Laurent Brossoit (35 saves / 36 shots)

May 4	Portland Winterhawks	3 – 0	Edmonton Oil Kings	Rose Garden	Recap
9:09 - pp - Ty Rattie (16)		First period	No scoring
17:20 - Brendan Leipsic (8); 18:45 - Oliver Bjorkstrand (6)		Second period	No scoring
No scoring		Third period	No scoring
Mac Carruth (16 saves / 16 shots)		Goalie stats	Laurent Brossoit (33 saves / 36 shots)

May 7	Edmonton Oil Kings	1 – 3	Portland Winterhawks	Rexall Place	Recap
No scoring		First period	Chase De Leo (5) - 4:39; Ty Rattie (17) - 8:17; Oliver Bjorkstrand (7) - 15:48
9:13 - Michael St. Croix (11)		Second period	No scoring
No scoring		Third period	No scoring
Laurent Brossoit (24 saves / 27 shots)		Goalie stats	Mac Carruth (38 saves / 39 shots)

May 8	Edmonton Oil Kings	1 – 2	Portland Winterhawks	Rexall Place	Recap
No scoring		First period	Brendan Leipsic (9) - 17:13
No scoring		Second period	Troy Rutkowski (4) - pp - 9:54
4:45 - Mitchell Moroz (2)		Third period	No scoring
Laurent Brossoit (19 saves / 21 shots)		Goalie stats	Mac Carruth (29 saves / 30 shots)

May 10	Portland Winterhawks	2 – 3	OT	Edmonton Oil Kings	Rose Garden	Recap
0:15 - Joey Baker (3)		First period		T.J. Foster (4) - 10:14
No scoring		Second period		No scoring
14:05 - Brendan Leipsic (10)		Third period		Michael St. Croix (12) - 7:01
No scoring		First overtime period		Michael St. Croix (13) - 7:24
Mac Carruth (27 saves / 30 shots)		Goalie stats		Laurent Brossoit (49 saves / 51 shots)

May 12	Edmonton Oil Kings	1 – 5	Portland Winterhawks	Rexall Place	Recap
1:04 - Travis Ewanyk (6)		First period	Ty Rattie (18) - sh - 4:28; Ty Rattie (19) - sh - 7:15
No scoring		Second period	Oliver Bjorkstrand (8) - 3:54; Ty Rattie (20) - 13:25
No scoring		Third period	Taylor Leier (9) - en - 19:21
Laurent Brossoit (19 saves / 23 shots)		Goalie stats	Mac Carruth (26 saves / 27 shots)

Portland wins series 4 – 2

== Playoff scoring leaders ==
Note: GP = Games played; G = Goals; A = Assists; Pts = Points; PIM = Penalty minutes

Player	Team	GP	G	A	Pts	PIM
Ty Rattie	Portland Winterhawks	21	20	16	36	17
Nic Petan	Portland Winterhawks	21	9	19	28	16
Michael St. Croix	Edmonton Oil Kings	22	13	13	26	14
Brendan Leipsic	Portland Winterhawks	21	10	14	24	41
JC Lipon	Kamloops Blazers	15	6	17	23	20
Stephane Legault	Edmonton Oil Kings	22	6	16	22	10
Brendan Ranford	Kamloops Blazers	15	5	15	20	0
Derrick Pouliot	Portland Winterhawks	21	4	16	20	12
Henrik Samuelsson	Edmonton Oil Kings	22	11	8	19	43
Oliver Bjorkstrand	Portland Winterhawks	21	8	11	19	4

== Playoff leading goaltenders ==
Note: GP = Games played; Mins = Minutes played; W = Wins; L = Losses; GA = Goals Allowed; SO = Shutouts; SV& = Save percentage; GAA = Goals against average

Player	Team	GP	Mins	W	L	GA	SO	Sv%	GAA
Mac Carruth	Portland Winterhawks	21	1254	16	4	35	5	.937	1.63
Laurent Brossoit	Edmonton Oil Kings	22	1322	14	5	40	5	.935	1.82
Patrik Bartošák	Red Deer Rebels	9	548	5	4	18	1	.941	1.97
Cam Lanigan	Medicine Hat Tigers	8	440	4	4	17	1	.944	2.32
Chris Driedger	Calgary Hitmen	17	1006	11	6	40	1	.931	2.39

== WHL awards ==
Scotty Munro Memorial Trophy	Regular season champions	Portland Winterhawks	
Four Broncos Memorial Trophy	Player of the Year	Adam Lowry	Swift Current Broncos
Bob Clarke Trophy	Top Scorer	Brendan Leipsic & Nic Petan (tie)	Portland Winterhawks
Bill Hunter Memorial Trophy	Top Defenseman	Brenden Kichton	Spokane Chiefs
Jim Piggott Memorial Trophy	Rookie of the Year	Seth Jones	Portland Winterhawks
Del Wilson Trophy	Top Goaltender	Patrik Bartosak	Red Deer Rebels
WHL Plus-Minus Award	Top Plus-Minus Rating	Nic Petan	Portland Winterhawks
Brad Hornung Trophy	Most Sportsmanlike Player	Dylan Wruck	Edmonton Oil Kings
Daryl K. (Doc) Seaman Trophy	Scholastic Player of the Year	Josh Morrissey	Prince Albert Raiders
Jim Donlevy Memorial Trophy	Scholastic team of the Year	Portland Winterhawks	
Dunc McCallum Memorial Trophy	Coach of the Year	Ryan McGill	Kootenay Ice
Lloyd Saunders Memorial Trophy	Executive of the Year	Bob Green	Edmonton Oil Kings
Allen Paradice Memorial Trophy	Top Official	Nathan Wieler	
St. Clair Group Trophy	Marketing/Public Relations Award	Kamloops Blazers	
Doug Wickenheiser Memorial Trophy	Humanitarian of the Year	Cody Sylvester	Calgary Hitmen
WHL Playoff MVP	WHL Finals Most Valuable Player	Ty Rattie	Portland Winterhawks
Professional Hockey Achievement; Academic Recipient	Alumni Achievement Awards	Mike Modano	

=== All-Star teams ===
==== Eastern Conference ====
First Team		Pos.	Second Team	
Player	Team	Pos.	Player	Team
Patrik Bartosak	Red Deer Rebels	G	Laurent Brossoit	Edmonton Oil Kings
Morgan Rielly	Moose Jaw Warriors	D	Alex Roach	Calgary Hitmen
Darren Dietz	Saskatoon Blades	D	Keegan Lowe	Edmonton Oil Kings
Adam Lowry	Swift Current Broncos	F	Sam Reinhart	Kootenay Ice
Michael St. Croix	Edmonton Oil Kings	F	Cody Sylvester	Calgary Hitmen
Curtis Valk	Medicine Hat Tigers	F	Hunter Shinkaruk	Medicine Hat Tigers

==== Western Conference ====
First Team		Pos.	Second Team	
Player	Team	Pos.	Player	Team
Mac Carruth	Portland Winterhawks	G	Jordon Cooke	Kelowna Rockets
Brenden Kichton	Spokane Chiefs	D	Troy Rutkowski	Portland Winterhawks
Seth Jones	Portland Winterhawks	D	Tyler Wotherspoon	Portland Winterhawks
Colin Smith	Kamloops Blazers	F	Brendan Leipsic	Portland Winterhawks
Justin Feser	Tri-City Americans	F	Ty Rattie	Portland Winterhawks
Nic Petan	Portland Winterhawks	F	Myles Bell	Kelowna Rockets

== See also ==
- 2013 Memorial Cup
- List of WHL seasons
- 2012–13 OHL season
- 2012–13 QMJHL season
- 2012 in ice hockey
- 2013 in ice hockey

Preceded by 2011–12 WHL season	WHL seasons	Succeeded by 2013–14 WHL season
