= Patrik Bartošák =

Czech ice hockey player (born 1993)

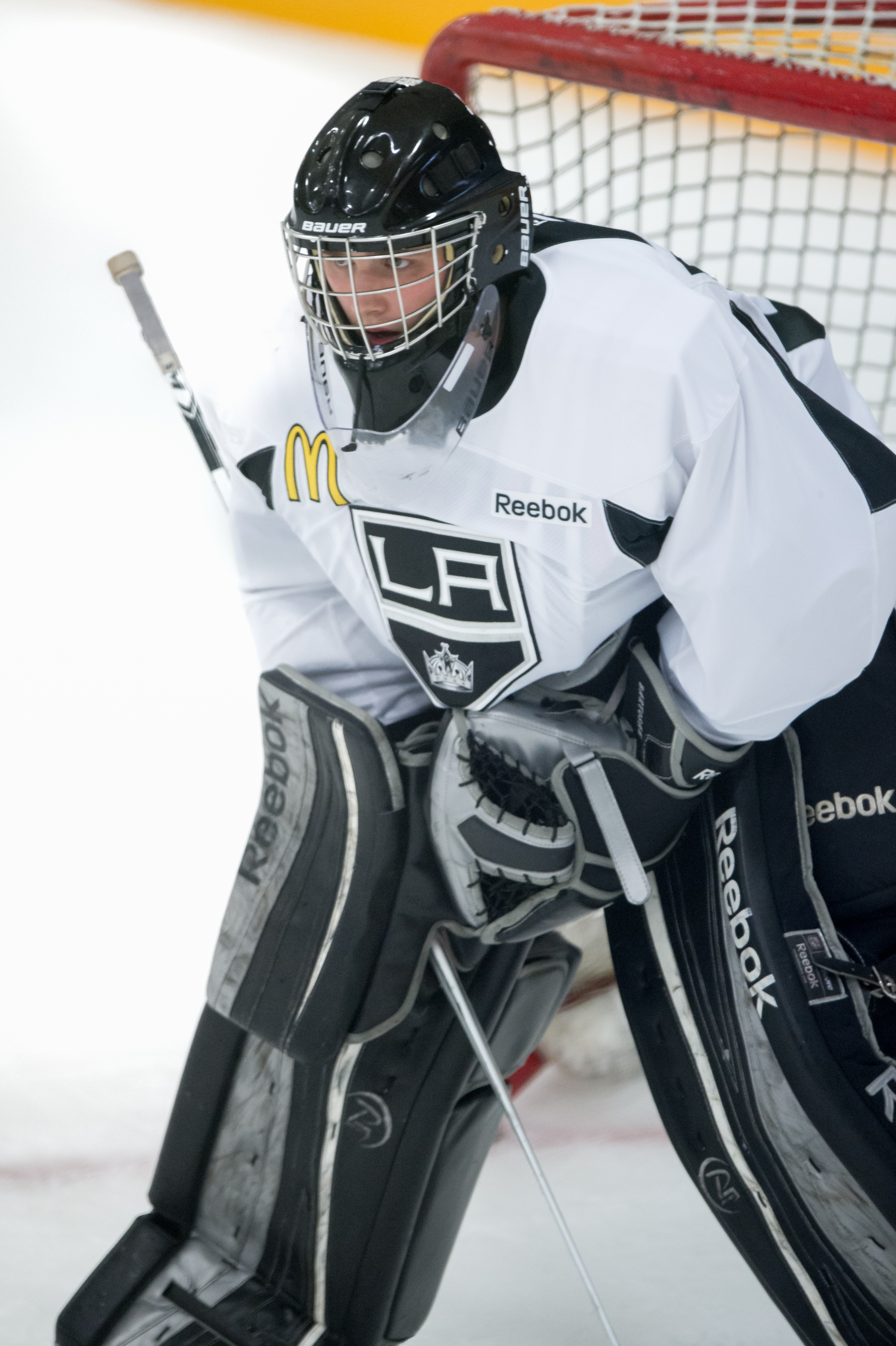
- Bartosak at the Los Angeles Kings' 2013 training camp
- Born: 29 March 1993 (age 33) Kopřivnice, Czech Republic
- Height: 6 ft 1 in (185 cm)
- Weight: 195 lb (88 kg; 13 st 13 lb)
- Position: Goaltender
- Catches: Left
- Liiga team Former teams: Lahti Pelicans; Manchester Monarchs; HC Vítkovice; HC Oceláři Třinec; Modo Hockey; Amur Khabarovsk; Lahti Pelicans; Mountfield HK
- National team: Czech Republic
- NHL draft: 146th overall, 2013; Los Angeles Kings
- Playing career: 2014–present

Patrik Bartošák (born 29 March 1993) is a Czech professional ice hockey goaltender. He is currently playing with the Lahti Pelicans of the Liiga. Bartošák was selected by the Los Angeles Kings in the 5th round (146th overall) of the 2013 NHL entry draft. Bartošák is a nephew of former NHL player, Radek Bonk.

== Playing career ==
Bartošák played major junior hockey with the Red Deer Rebels in the Western Hockey League from the 2011–12 season, was rewarded for his outstanding play during the 2012–13 WHL season by winning the Del Wilson Trophy as the Western Hockey League's Goaltender of the Year, and also being named to the 2013 WHL East First All-Star Team. He also won the CHL goalie of the year award for the 2012–13 season.

In the 2015–16 season, while with the Kings now ECHL affiliate, the Manchester Monarchs, Bartošák appeared in 2 games before he was suspended indefinitely without pay by the Kings, after he was arrested on second-degree assault charges in a domestic violence case against his then-girlfriend by New Hampshire authorities on 18 November 2015. On 1 February 2016, Bartošák effectively ended his tenure in the Kings organization in returning to his native Czech Republic and signing to return to HC Vítkovice Steel of the Czech Extraliga. With HC Vítkovice effectively agreeing to take over the final year of his entry-level contract with the Kings, Bartošák would not be retained with the qualifying offer by the Kings in the following off-season.

In four seasons with HC Vítkovice, Bartošák established himself as a top-ranked goaltender in the ELH. Following the 2018–19 season, having led the league in save percentage for a second successive season, Bartošák left at the conclusion of his contract and agreed to a two-year contract with rival club, HC Oceláři Třinec, on 1 May 2019.

After a season in the Finnish Liiga with the Lahti Pelicans, Bartošák continued his journeyman career by agreeing to a one-year contract with Russian club Amur Khabarovsk of the KHL on 22 June 2021. In the following 2021–22 season, Bartošák posted just two wins through 11 games for Amur, before leaving the club to conclude his season in returning to previous club, Lahti Pelicans of the Liiga on 16 February 2022.

== Awards and honours ==
Award	Year
WHL
East First All-Star Team	2013
Del Wilson Trophy	2013
CHL Goaltender of the Year	2013
East Second All-Star Team	2014
AHL
Calder Cup (Manchester Monarchs)	2015
ELH
Best SVS% (.933)	2018
Best SVS% (.935)	2019

Awards and achievements
Preceded by Tyler Bunz	Winner of the WHL Del Wilson Trophy; 2012–13	Succeeded by Jordon Cooke
