= Justin Feser =

Canadian professional ice hockey forward

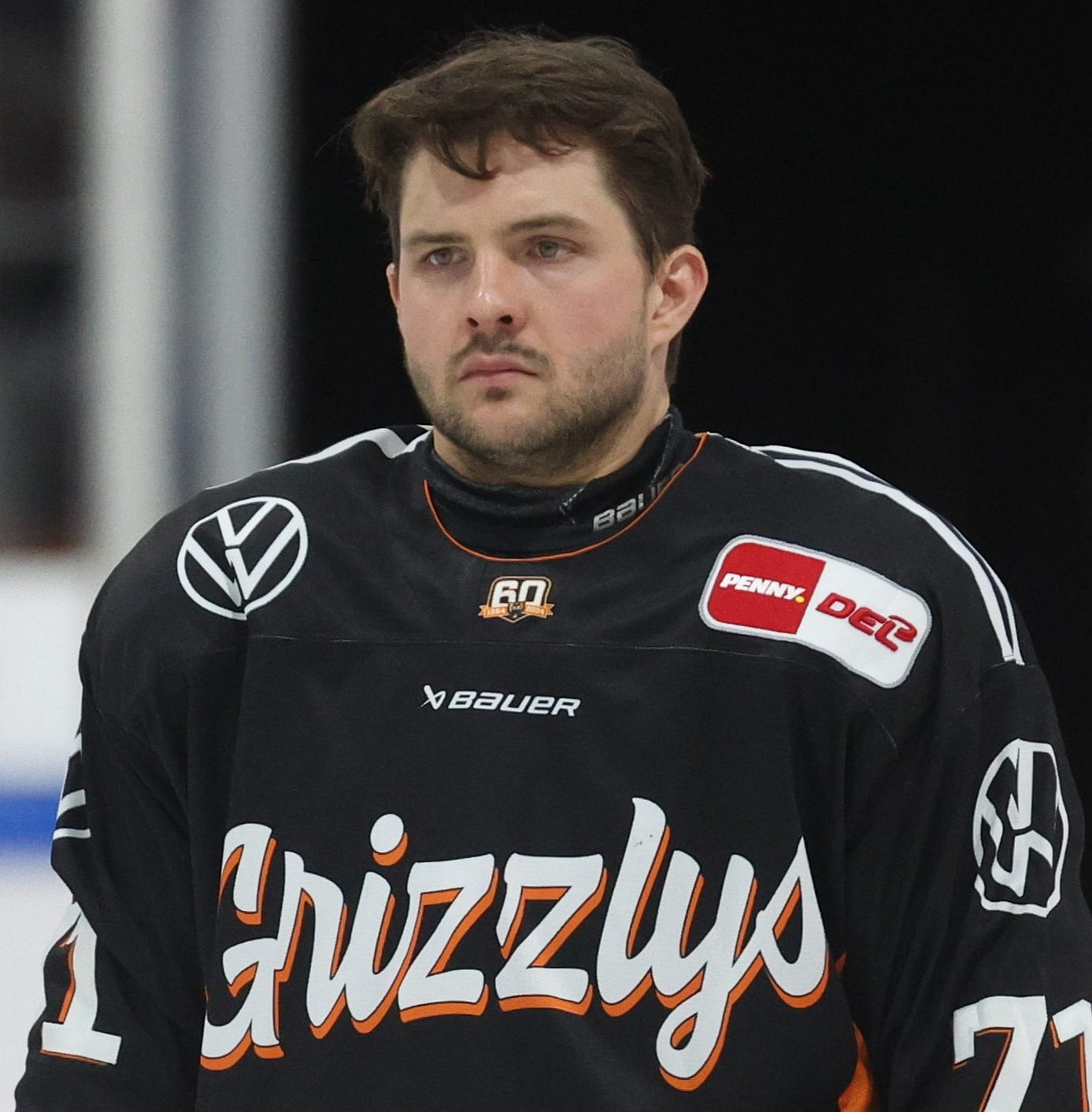
- Feser in 2024
- Born: July 29, 1992 (age 33) Red Deer, Alberta, Canada
- Height: 5 ft 9 in (175 cm)
- Weight: 190 lb (86 kg; 13 st 8 lb)
- Position: Left wing
- Shoots: Left
- DEL team Former teams: Grizzlys Wolfsburg; Portland Pirates; EHC Olten; Krefeld Pinguine; Fischtown Pinguins; ERC Ingolstadt
- NHL draft: Undrafted
- Playing career: 2013–present

Justin Feser (born July 29, 1992) is a Canadian professional ice hockey forward. He is currently playing with Grizzlys Wolfsburg in the Deutsche Eishockey Liga (DEL).

== Playing career ==
Feser played his entire five year junior hockey career with the Tri-City Americans of the Western Hockey League. After his junior hockey career concluded with the Tri-City Americans of the WHL he then signed an Amateur try-out deal with the Portland Pirates in the American Hockey League (AHL). He appeared in six games with the Pirates and in the off-season signed a contract with EHC Olten of the National League B (NLB) in Switzerland.

Feser was rewarded for his outstanding performance during the 2012–13 WHL season by being named to the 2013 WHL West First All-Star Team as well as being named the Western Conference finalist for the Four Broncos Memorial Trophy for WHL player of the year. During the same season Justin broke a 21-year-old WHL record for the most consecutive games played (312) and captured the WHL's All-time Iron Man record.

In 2013, Feser took his game to Switzerland joining EHC Olten, where he played until the conclusion of the 2016–17 season. Following his four-year stint with the National League B side, he headed to Germany, signing with Deutsche Eishockey Liga club Krefeld Pinguine in June 2017. Feser spent the duration of the 2017–18 season with Krefeld, posting 14 goals in 44 games.

On April 23, 2018, having concluded his contract with Krefeld, Feser left to sign a one-year deal with rival DEL club, Fischtown Pinguins.

Feser played two seasons with Fischtown before leaving at the conclusion of his contract to sign a one-year deal with his third DEL outfit, ERC Ingolstadt, on March 19, 2020.

After three seasons with ERC Ingolstadt, Feser left the club out of contract and signed a three-year contract to continue in the DEL with Grizzlys Wolfsburg on May 16, 2023.

== Career statistics ==
=== Regular season and playoffs ===
			Regular season					Playoffs
Season	Team	League	GP	G	A	Pts	PIM	GP	G	A	Pts	PIM
2007–08	Red Deer Rebels	AMHL	36	19	11	30	30	—	—	—	—	—
2008–09	Tri-City Americans	WHL	63	12	16	28	21	11	4	2	6	8
2009–10	Tri-City Americans	WHL	72	36	37	73	28	22	4	14	18	14
2010–11	Tri-City Americans	WHL	72	26	37	63	34	10	4	5	9	0
2011–12	Tri-City Americans	WHL	72	37	46	83	43	15	4	8	12	2
2012–13	Tri-City Americans	WHL	72	44	62	106	57	5	2	3	5	4
2012–13	Portland Pirates	AHL	6	0	2	2	4	—	—	—	—	—
2013–14	EHC Olten	NLB	44	20	20	40	37	6	4	4	8	0
2014–15	EHC Olten	NLB	47	17	32	49	18	16	4	9	13	10
2015–16	EHC Olten	NLB	45	18	31	49	37	13	7	7	14	0
2016–17	EHC Olten	NLB	45	22	30	52	24	5	1	2	3	4
2017–18	Krefeld Pinguine	DEL	44	14	12	26	10	—	—	—	—	—
2018–19	Fischtown Pinguins	DEL	52	11	25	36	12	3	1	1	2	6
2019–20	Fischtown Pinguins	DEL	52	17	15	32	38	—	—	—	—	—
2020–21	ERC Ingolstadt	DEL	23	5	8	13	2	5	0	0	0	0
2021–22	ERC Ingolstadt	DEL	52	20	31	51	20	2	0	0	0	0
2022–23	ERC Ingolstadt	DEL	22	9	10	19	10	16	3	7	10	4
2023–24	Grizzlys Wolfsburg	DEL	52	11	26	37	14	4	1	2	3	0
2024–25	Grizzlys Wolfsburg	DEL	43	11	18	29	18	—	—	—	—	—
DEL totals			340	98	145	243	124	30	5	10	15	10

=== International ===
Year	Team	Event	Result	GP	G	A	Pts	PIM
2009	Canada Pacific	U17	2nd place, silver medalist(s)	6	1	1	2	0
Junior totals				6	1	1	2	0

== Awards and honours ==
Award	Year
WHL
First All-Star Team	2012–13
