= JC Lipon =

Canadian ice hockey player (born 1993)

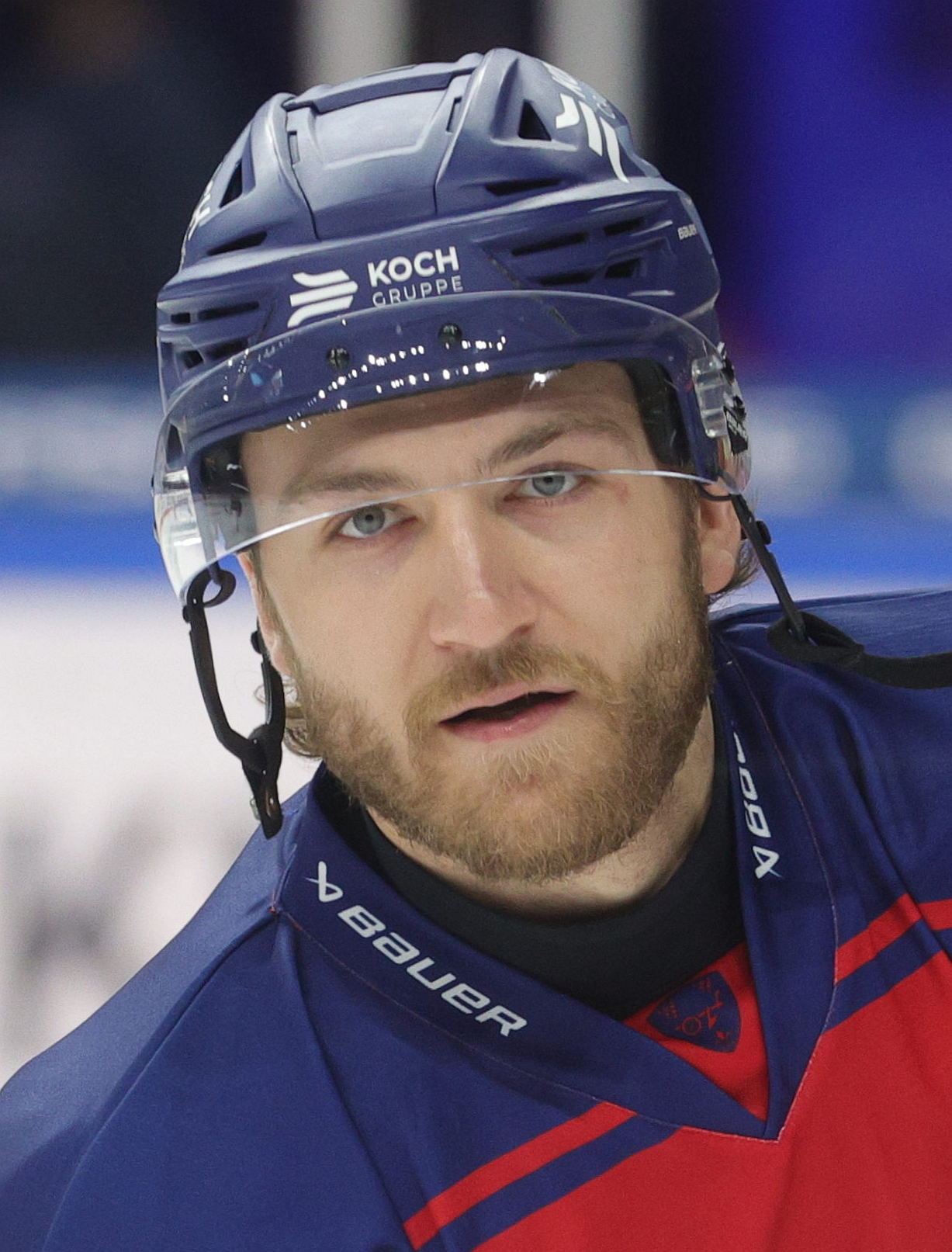
- Lipon with the Straubing Tigers in 2024
- Born: July 10, 1993 (age 32) Regina, Saskatchewan, Canada
- Height: 6 ft 0 in (183 cm)
- Weight: 190 lb (86 kg; 13 st 8 lb)
- Position: Right wing
- Shoots: Right
- ICEHL team Former teams: HC Pustertal Wölfe; St. John's IceCaps; Winnipeg Jets; Manitoba Moose; Dinamo Riga; IK Oskarshamn; HC Sochi; HC Sibir Novosibirsk; Straubing Tigers
- NHL draft: 91st overall, 2013; Winnipeg Jets
- Playing career: 2013–present

JC Lipon (born July 10, 1993) is a Canadian professional ice hockey forward currently playing for HC Pustertal Wölfe of the ICE Hockey League (ICEHL). He has previously played for the Winnipeg Jets of the National Hockey League (NHL).

== Playing career ==
Lipon was selected by the Winnipeg Jets in the third round (91st overall) of the 2013 NHL entry draft.

He played junior hockey for the Kamloops Blazers of the Western Hockey League. He made his NHL debut for the Jets on January 18, 2016. On August 15, 2016, the Winnipeg Jets signed Lipon to a one-year, two-way contract worth $650,000.

On August 17, 2020, Lipon left the Winnipeg Jets organization as a free agent and signed his first contract abroad with Latvian based, Dinamo Riga of the Kontinental Hockey League (KHL). In his first season abroad in 2020–21, Lipon made an impact with Dinamo Riga, collecting 8 goals and 20 points through 37 regular season games. With Riga well out of playoff contention, Lipon left the club to join the Swedish top-tier club, IK Oskarshamn of the Swedish Hockey League (SHL), for the remainder of the season on February 16, 2021.

As a free agent in the following off-season, Lipon opted to return to the KHL, agreeing to a one-year contract with Russian-based, HC Sochi, on August 24, 2021. In the 2021–22 season, Lipon recorded 3 goals and 10 points through 27 regular season games with Sochi before he was traded to HC Sibir Novosibirsk on December 27, 2021.

On July 26, 2022, having left the KHL as a free agent, Lipon signed a one-year contract in Germany with Straubing Tigers of the DEL.

== Career statistics ==
=== Regular season and playoffs ===
			Regular season					Playoffs
Season	Team	League	GP	G	A	Pts	PIM	GP	G	A	Pts	PIM
2008–09	Regina Pat Canadians	SMHL	43	4	9	13	26	5	2	1	3	4
2009–10	Kamloops Blazers	WHL	53	3	10	13	38	3	0	0	0	0
2010–11	Kamloops Blazers	WHL	65	3	18	21	111	—	—	—	—	—
2011–12	Kamloops Blazers	WHL	69	19	46	65	111	10	2	7	9	20
2012–13	Kamloops Blazers	WHL	61	36	53	89	115	15	6	17	23	20
2013–14	St. John's IceCaps	AHL	72	9	32	41	136	14	0	1	1	4
2014–15	St. John's IceCaps	AHL	75	5	21	26	163	—	—	—	—	—
2015–16	Manitoba Moose	AHL	45	13	17	30	87	—	—	—	—	—
2015–16	Winnipeg Jets	NHL	9	0	1	1	5	—	—	—	—	—
2016–17	Manitoba Moose	AHL	71	12	18	30	129	—	—	—	—	—
2017–18	Manitoba Moose	AHL	68	17	21	38	103	9	1	0	1	13
2018–19	Manitoba Moose	AHL	60	11	15	26	121	—	—	—	—	—
2019–20	Manitoba Moose	AHL	61	13	18	31	100	—	—	—	—	—
2020–21	Dinamo Riga	KHL	37	8	12	20	74	—	—	—	—	—
2020–21	IK Oskarshamn	SHL	8	0	2	2	25	—	—	—	—	—
2021–22	HC Sochi	KHL	27	3	7	10	31	—	—	—	—	—
2021–22	Sibir Novosibirsk	KHL	5	0	0	0	5	5	0	2	2	2
2022–23	Straubing Tigers	DEL	53	20	21	41	57	7	1	1	2	2
2023–24	Straubing Tigers	DEL	34	13	10	23	36	11	6	3	9	11
2024–25	Straubing Tigers	DEL	42	11	14	25	70	6	0	3	3	4
NHL totals			9	0	1	1	5	—	—	—	—	—
KHL totals			69	11	19	30	110	5	0	2	2	2

=== International ===
Year	Team	Event	Result	GP	G	A	Pts	PIM
2010	Canada Western	U17	8th	5	0	5	5	4
2013	Canada	WJC	4th	5	0	0	0	27
Junior totals				10	0	6	5	31
