= Kale Kessy =

Canadian ice hockey player (born 1992)

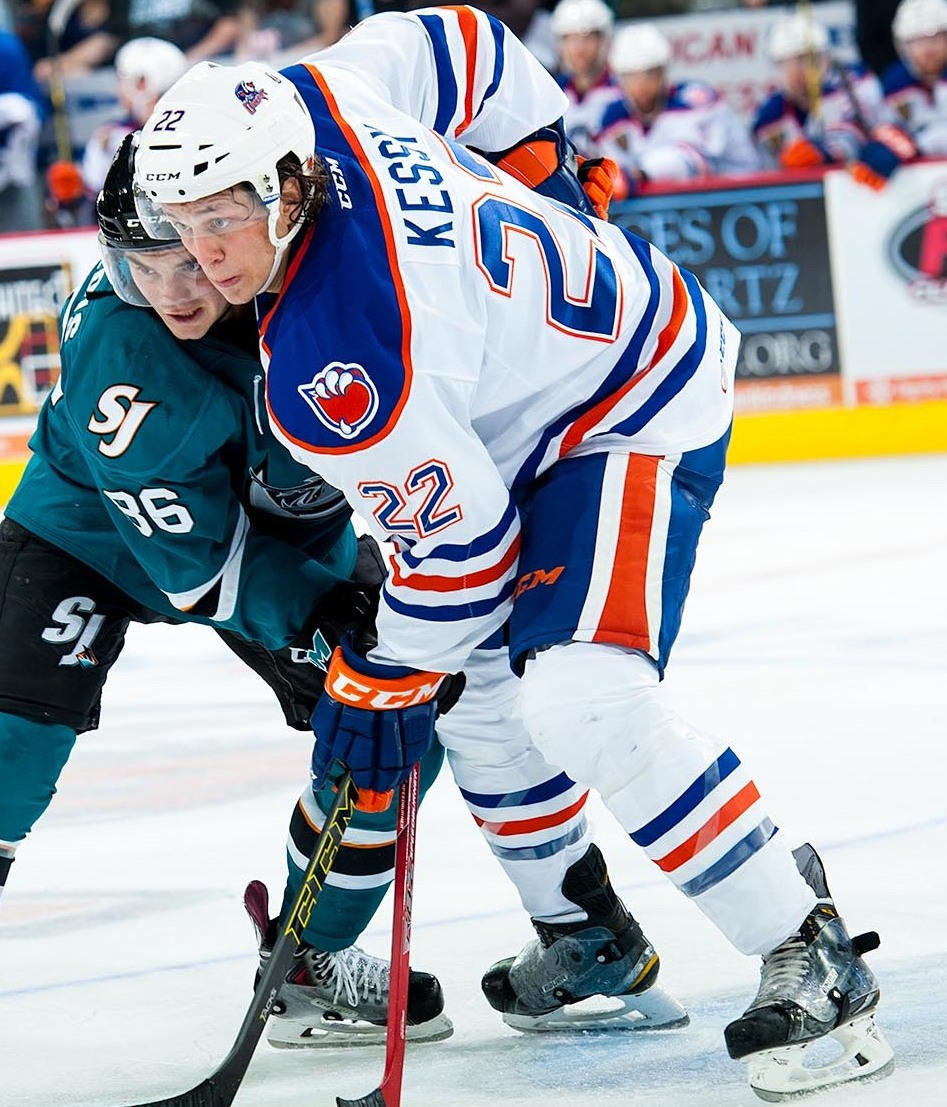
- Kessy (right) with the Bakersfield Condors in 2016
- Born: December 4, 1992 (age 33) Shaunavon, Saskatchewan, Canada
- Height: 6 ft 3 in (191 cm)
- Weight: 212 lb (96 kg; 15 st 2 lb)
- Position: Left wing
- Shoots: Left
- AHL team Former teams: Springfield Thunderbirds; Oklahoma City Barons; Bakersfield Condors; Manitoba Moose; Cleveland Monsters; Colorado Eagles; Hershey Bears; Iowa Wild; Syracuse Crunch
- NHL draft: 111th overall, 2011; Phoenix Coyotes
- Playing career: 2013–present

Kale Kessy (born December 4, 1992) is a Canadian professional ice hockey left winger for the Springfield Thunderbirds of the American Hockey League (AHL). He was originally drafted in the fourth round, 111th overall, by the Phoenix Coyotes in the 2011 NHL entry draft.

== Early life ==
Kessy was born on December 4, 1992, in Shaunavon, Saskatchewan. His cousin Jennifer Kessy was a silver medalist for the United States in beach volleyball at the 2012 Summer Olympics.

== Playing career ==
Although Kessy was born in Shaunavon, Saskatchewan, he moved to Swift Current for a couple of years and played peewee hockey. He eventually moved to Medicine Hat at the age of 12 to play bantam and midget hockey. While in Medicine Hat, he attended Notre Dame Academy.

=== Major junior ===
Kessy joined the Medicine Hat Tigers of the Western Hockey League (WHL) for nine games during their 2008–09 season, seeing limited ice time in nine games. He rejoined the team for their 2009–10 season and recorded his first major junior goal on September 18, 2009. He stayed with the team for the remainder of their season and scored 11 goals and 18 assists in 70 games while also leading the team in penalty minutes. During the 2010–11 season, Kessy recorded 10 goals and 24 points in 65 games to help the Tigers reach the league semifinals. While his offensive output dipped from the previous season, he recorded three goals and six points in 14 post-season games. Leading up to the 2011 NHL entry draft, Kessy was ranked 101st amongst North American skaters by the NHL Central Scouting Bureau. He was eventually drafted in the fourth round, 111th overall, by the Phoenix Coyotes, which he described as "a great honour."

During the 2012 offseason, Kessy improved his training by specifically focusing on his shooting and stick handling. He credited his Medicine Hat linemates Colin Smith and Chase Souto for "helping me reach my potential." On October 1, 2012, Kessy was handed a 12 game suspension for checking the head of Lethbridge Hurricanes defenseman Ryan Pilon during a game. While serving the suspension, he was traded to the Vancouver Giants who wished to add toughness to their lineup. His suspension was later reduced by two games and he joined the Giants lineup on October 26 against the Victoria Royals. Upon returning, Kessy said "I'm definitely going to be the most watched guy in the league...I'm definitely going to have to be more careful."

On March 29, 2013, Kessy's playing rights were traded to the Edmonton Oilers in exchange for Tobias Rieder. At the time of the trade, he had scored 43 points in 60 games split between the Kamloops Blazers and Vancouver Giants. On April 2, Kessy recorded a hat-trick in a 6–2 win over the Victoria Royals to win their first-round 2013 WHL Playoffs series.

=== Professional ===
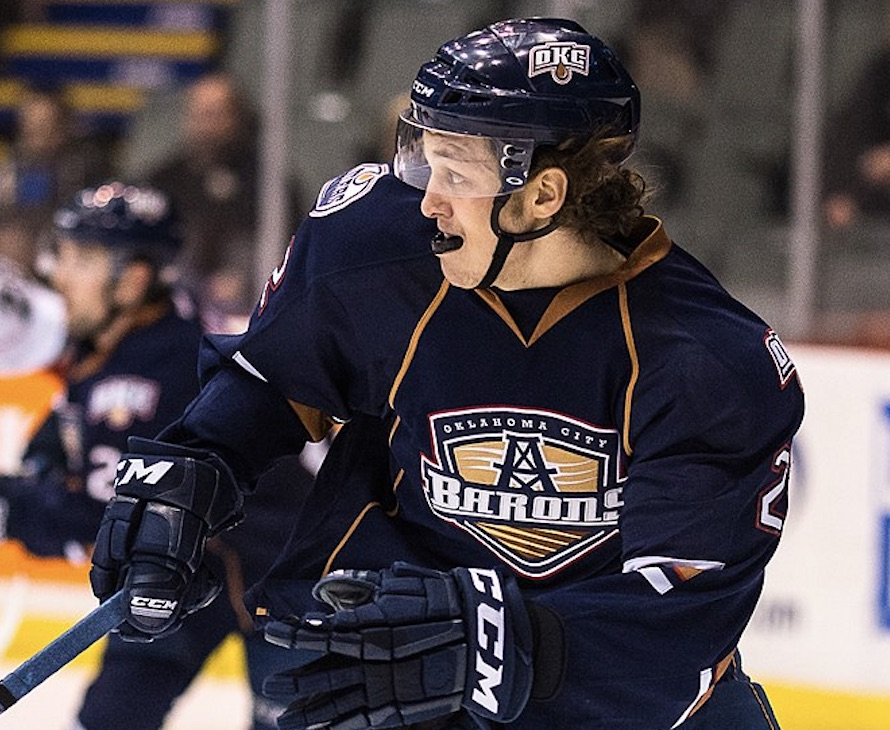
Kessy with the Oklahoma City Barons in 2013.

Kessy made his professional debut with the Bakersfield Condors of the ECHL during the 2013–14 season. After playing in 18 games and recording a goal and an assist, he was re-assigned to the Oklahoma City Barons (OKC) in the American Hockey League (AHL). Kessy's progress in the AHL was noticed by the Oilers and coach Todd Nelson described him as being "on the cusp of maybe being an Oilers’ call-up." However, on December 2, 2014, he suffered a season-ending knee injury that required surgery.

Upon returning to the ice, Kessy spent the entirety of the 2015–16 season with the Condors and recorded. The following season, he joined the Winnipeg Jets organization and signed with their AHL affiliate, the Manitoba Moose. After attending their training camp, he was re-assigned to their ECHL affiliate, the Tulsa Oilers. Kessy signed a professional tryout with the Manitoba Moose after playing 18 games with the Tulsa Oilers in the ECHL. He played 12 games with the Moose before being released from his contract. On September 27, 2018, Kessy signed an ECHL contract with the Idaho Steelheads for the 2018–19 season. He returned to the Moose on another contract in October but was released again from the team after playing in one game. In January, he received two suspensions and fines from the league. During the season, he signed an AHL contract with the Colorado Eagles and played 15 games with them before returning to the ECHL.

On February 25, 2020, Kessy sustained an injury during a fight against Charlotte Checkers player Derek Sheppard and was admitted into Milton S. Hershey Medical Center for overnight observation. Two months later, he was the recipient of the Hershey's 2019–20 IOA/American Specialty AHL Man of the Year for his contributions to the Hershey community during the season. On September 25, 2020, the Bears announced that they had re-signed Kessy to a one-year, American Hockey League contract. During the 2020–21 season, Kessy registered two goals and four assists while also accumulating a league-leading 115 penalty minutes. As such, he signed a two-year contract extension to remain with the Bears on July 15, 2021.

In his fourth season under contract with the Bears in 2022–23, Kessy made 25 appearances in adding 2 goals. Primarily serving as a depth forward, Kessy was traded by Hershey in a return to the Colorado Eagles in exchange for future considerations on March 8, 2023.

As a free agent at the conclusion of the season, Kessy extended his career in the AHL in agreeing to a one-year contract with the Iowa Wild, affiliate to the Minnesota Wild, on July 3, 2023. In the 2023–24 season, Kessy made 26 appearances for the Wild, going scoreless while registering 119 penalty minutes.

On July 2, 2024, Kessy joined his eighth AHL club after signing as a free agent to a one-year contract with the Syracuse Crunch for the 2024–25 season. Kessy as a depth forward registered 1 assist through 17 appearances with the Crunch before he was traded to the Springfield Thunderbirds in exchange for Reece Newkirk on February 20, 2025.

== Career statistics ==
			Regular season					Playoffs
Season	Team	League	GP	G	A	Pts	PIM	GP	G	A	Pts	PIM
2007–08	Medicine Hat Tigers U18	AMHL	1	0	0	0	0	—	—	—	—	—
2008–09	Medicine Hat Tigers U18	AMHL	33	17	12	29	42	—	—	—	—	—
2008–09	Medicine Hat Tigers	WHL	9	0	0	0	2	—	—	—	—	—
2009–10	Medicine Hat Tigers	WHL	70	11	18	29	123	12	1	3	4	10
2010–11	Medicine Hat Tigers	WHL	65	10	14	24	129	14	3	3	6	37
2011–12	Medicine Hat Tigers	WHL	49	4	12	16	151	2	0	1	1	2
2012–13	Medicine Hat Tigers	WHL	2	2	0	2	17	—	—	—	—	—
2012–13	Vancouver Giants	WHL	27	7	9	16	45	—	—	—	—	—
2012–13	Kamloops Blazers	WHL	31	12	13	25	44	15	11	3	14	21
2013–14	Oklahoma City Barons	AHL	54	2	4	6	88	—	—	—	—	—
2013–14	Bakersfield Condors	ECHL	3	1	0	1	0	—	—	—	—	—
2014–15	Oklahoma City Barons	AHL	17	3	3	6	61	—	—	—	—	—
2015–16	Bakersfield Condors	AHL	56	7	5	12	79	—	—	—	—	—
2016–17	Tulsa Oilers	ECHL	32	11	12	23	72	—	—	—	—	—
2016–17	Manitoba Moose	AHL	16	0	1	1	16	—	—	—	—	—
2017–18	Manitoba Moose	AHL	1	0	0	0	5	—	—	—	—	—
2017–18	Tulsa Oilers	ECHL	52	13	18	31	239	—	—	—	—	—
2017–18	Cleveland Monsters	AHL	15	1	3	4	56	—	—	—	—	—
2018–19	Manitoba Moose	AHL	1	0	0	0	0	—	—	—	—	—
2018–19	Idaho Steelheads	ECHL	35	11	22	33	289	10	2	4	6	48
2018–19	Colorado Eagles	AHL	15	0	0	0	81	1	0	0	0	2
2019–20	Hershey Bears	AHL	24	0	0	0	102	—	—	—	—	—
2020–21	Hershey Bears	AHL	21	2	4	6	115	—	—	—	—	—
2021–22	Hershey Bears	AHL	51	4	1	5	84	3	0	0	0	5
2022–23	Hershey Bears	AHL	25	2	0	2	68	—	—	—	—	—
2022–23	Colorado Eagles	AHL	5	0	0	0	39	6	1	0	1	14
2023–24	Iowa Wild	AHL	26	0	0	0	119	—	—	—	—	—
2024–25	Syracuse Crunch	AHL	17	0	1	1	41	—	—	—	—	—
2024–25	Springfield Thunderbirds	AHL	15	0	0	0	7	3	0	0	0	0
2025–26	Springfield Thunderbirds	AHL	41	0	0	0	67	1	0	0	0	2
AHL totals			400	21	22	43	1,028	14	1	0	1	23
