= Trevor Cheek =

American professional ice hockey forward (born 1992)

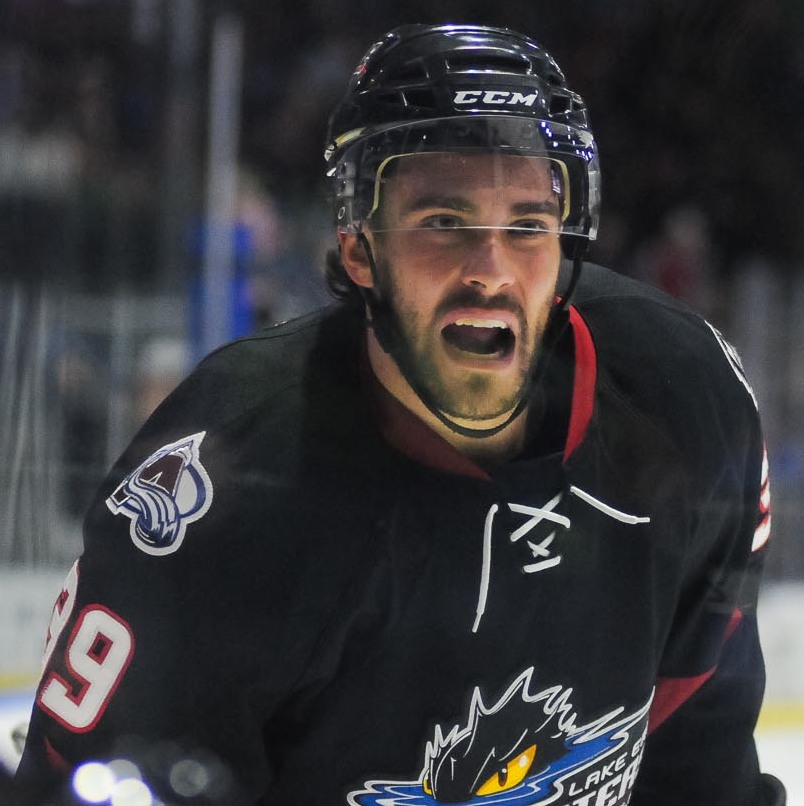
- Cheek with the Lake Erie Monsters in 2014
- Born: December 29, 1992 (age 33) Vancouver, Washington, U.S.
- Height: 6 ft 2 in (188 cm)
- Weight: 205 lb (93 kg; 14 st 9 lb)
- Position: Left wing
- Shoots: Left
- Allsv team Former teams: Kristianstads IK; Lake Erie Monsters; San Antonio Rampage; Tucson Roadrunners; Esbjerg Energy; Rødovre Mighty Bulls
- NHL draft: Undrafted
- Playing career: 2013–present

Trevor Cheek (born December 29, 1992) is an American professional ice hockey forward currently playing under contract with Kristianstads IK in the HockeyAllsvenskan (Allsv).

== Playing career ==
Cheek first learned to play hockey from his father Brian Cheek. Cheek first played major junior hockey in the Western Hockey League with the Calgary Hitmen in the 2010–11 season. Having increased his productivity in each season Cheek was dealt at the beginning of the 2012–13, his third with the Hitmen, to the Vancouver Giants on October 3, 2012. Cheek found a role on the Giants offensive lines in compiling 18 goals in 39 games before he was again traded to contending team, the Edmonton Oil Kings on January 9, 2013. Cheek scored 27 points in 31 regular season games before posting 16 points in 15 post-season games as the Oil Kings lost the Championship finals to the Portland Winterhawks.

Cheek opted to forgo his overage year in signing a three-year entry-level contract with the Colorado Avalanche on May 13, 2013. After attending the Avalanche training camp, Cheek was assigned to AHL affiliate, the Lake Erie Monsters to begin his first professional season in 2013–14 season. As a depth checking-line forward, Cheek appeared in 46 games with the Monsters scoring 3 goals and 8 points.

During the 2015–16 season, Cheek was unable to cement a role in the AHL and split the year between the San Antonio Rampage and the Fort Wayne Komets of the ECHL, producing 17 goals in 28 games. Having completed his entry-level deal, Cheek was not tendered a contract to remain with the Avalanche.

As a free agent, Cheek opted to continue in the ECHL with the Fort Wayne Komets, signing a one-year deal on August 17, 2016. Prior to the 2016–17 season, Cheek accepted an invite to attend the inaugural training camp of the Tucson Roadrunners of the AHL. He remained on the roster to begin the year, however was released to the Komets having served as a healthy scratch on November 2, 2016. Cheek scored at a point-per-game pace with the Komets, earning a PTO in a return to the Roadrunners on December 5, 2016. He added 4 assists in 23 games before returning to the Komets for their playoff run.

On July 28, 2017, Cheek extended his association with the Roadrunners, by securing a one-year AHL contract. In the 2017–18 season, and for the second year running, Cheek split his time between the Roadrunners and the Fort Wayne Komets. Cheek recorded 4 goals for 10 points in 27 games with the Roadrunners while also registering 20 points in 20 games with the Komets. Showing a high work ethic and increased scoring touch in his time with the Roadrunners, Cheek was re-signed as a free agent to return for his third season in Tucson on July 19, 2018.

Cheek remained on the Roadrunners opening night roster to begin the 2018–19 season. Cheek reached a personal milestone in participating in his 200th AHL game against the San Jose Barracuda in a 3-2 shootout loss on October 15, 2018. Cheek made 63 regular season appearances with Tucson, contributing with 7 goals and 10 points.

After three seasons within the Roadrunners organization, Cheek left the club as a free agent in the off-season, signing his first European contract in agreeing to a one-year contract with Danish club, Esbjerg Energy of the Metal Ligaen on July 5, 2019.

Following a second season in the Metal Ligaen, with the Rødovre Mighty Bulls, Cheek was signed as a free agent with Swedish second tier club, Krisitanstads IK of the HockeyAllsvenskan on May 12, 2021.

== Career statistics ==
			Regular season					Playoffs
Season	Team	League	GP	G	A	Pts	PIM	GP	G	A	Pts	PIM
2010–11	Calgary Hitmen	WHL	57	10	15	25	37	—	—	—	—	—
2011–12	Calgary Hitmen	WHL	67	23	26	49	75	5	3	1	4	4
2012–13	Calgary Hitmen	WHL	1	0	1	1	0	—	—	—	—	—
2012–13	Vancouver Giants	WHL	39	18	14	32	35	—	—	—	—	—
2012–13	Edmonton Oil Kings	WHL	31	14	13	27	22	15	8	8	16	14
2013–14	Lake Erie Monsters	AHL	46	3	5	8	30	—	—	—	—	—
2014–15	Lake Erie Monsters	AHL	66	6	9	15	63	—	—	—	—	—
2015–16	Fort Wayne Komets	ECHL	28	17	8	25	38	16	5	8	13	10
2015–16	San Antonio Rampage	AHL	34	4	5	9	21	—	—	—	—	—
2016–17	Fort Wayne Komets	ECHL	35	19	15	34	80	10	2	3	5	25
2016–17	Tucson Roadrunners	AHL	23	0	4	4	10	—	—	—	—	—
2017–18	Tucson Roadrunners	AHL	27	4	6	10	21	9	0	2	2	4
2017–18	Fort Wayne Komets	ECHL	20	9	11	20	14	5	0	1	1	6
2018–19	Tucson Roadrunners	AHL	63	7	3	10	48	—	—	—	—	—
2019–20	Esbjerg Energy	DEN	41	16	14	30	26	—	—	—	—	—
2020–21	Rødovre Mighty Bulls	DEN	43	20	17	37	30	—	—	—	—	—
AHL totals			259	24	32	56	193	9	0	2	2	4
