= Mac Carruth =

American ice hockey goaltender

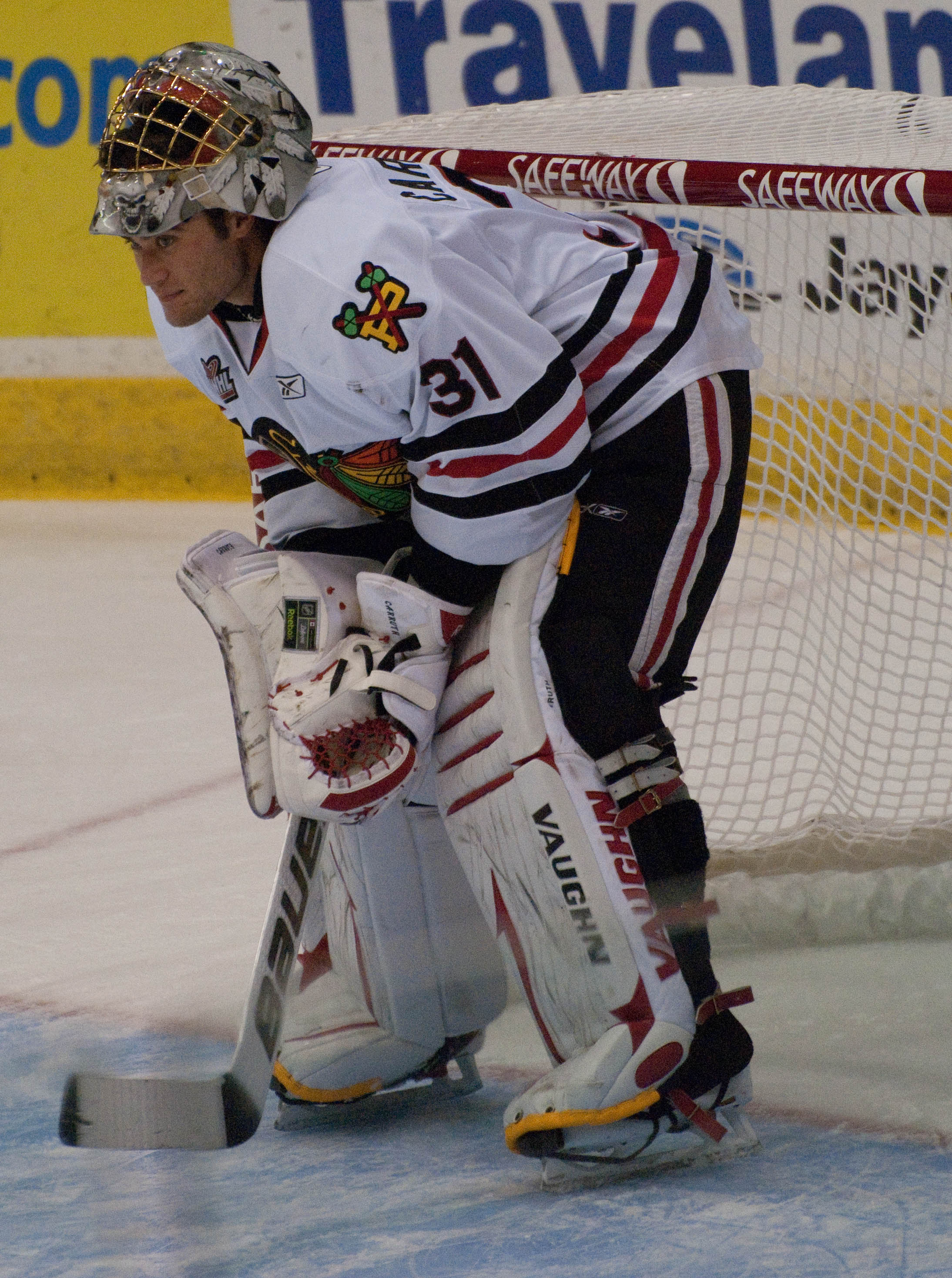
- Carruth with the Portland Winterhawks in 2010
- Born: March 25, 1992 (age 34) Salt Lake City, Utah, U.S.
- Height: 6 ft 3 in (191 cm)
- Weight: 180 lb (82 kg; 12 st 12 lb)
- Position: Goaltender
- Catches: Left
- Ligue Magnus team Former teams: Dragons de Rouen; Rockford IceHogs; Toledo Walleye; Florida Everblades; Indy Fuel; Fehérvár AV19; Lausitzer Füchse; Herning Blue Fox; Cardiff Devils
- NHL draft: 191st overall, 2010; Chicago Blackhawks
- Playing career: 2013–present

Macmillan Carruth (born March 25, 1992) is an American ice hockey goaltender who is currently signed to French Ligue Magnus side Dragons de Rouen. He most recently played for UK EIHL side Cardiff Devils and before that with Danish Metal Ligaen side Herning Blue Fox. Carruth was selected by the Chicago Blackhawks in the 7th round (191st overall) of the 2011 NHL entry draft.

== Playing career ==
On May 24, 2012, the Chicago Blackhawks signed Carruth to a three-year, entry-level contract valued at $750,000 per year. The Blackhawks assigned Carruth to their minor league affiliate, the Rockford IceHogs, on September 15, 2012. The IceHogs reassigned Carruth to his junior team, the Portland Winterhawks, on October 6, 2012.

Carruth, who has played in the WHL since the 2009–10 season, was rewarded for his outstanding performance during the 2012–13 WHL season by being named to the 2013 WHL West First All-Star Team. He set the franchise record for most wins by a goalie on January 9, 2013 with his 106th win in a Winterhawks uniform. At that point, he already held several franchise playoff goaltending records as well as the regular season record for wins (42).

At the tail end of the 2013–14 season, Carruth was recalled to Chicago from the AHL's Rockford Icehogs prior to the 2014 NHL playoffs.

On August 17, 2015, after the conclusion of his entry-level contract, Carruth was unable to secure a further contract with the Blackhawks, however remained within the organization in signing a one-year AHL contract with the Rockford IceHogs. In a successful 2015–16 season split between the Rockford IceHogs and the Indy Fuel, Carruth was signed mid-season to another NHL deal with the Blackhawks on February 28, 2016.

As a restricted free agent, Carruth continued his tenure within the Blackhawks by signing a one-year extension on June 14, 2016.

After four seasons within the Blackhawks affiliates, Carruth left as a free agent. Un-signed over the summers, he accepted a professional tryout to attend the Providence Bruins training camp on September 25, 2017. On October 7, 2017, Carruth signed one-year contract with Fehérvár AV19 of the Erste Bank Eishockey Liga (EBEL).

After two seasons in the German DEL2 with Lausitzer Füchse, Carruth signed terms with UK EIHL side Cardiff Devils in July 2021.

After a season in Cardiff, where Carruth posted a save percentage of .937, earned a Second Team All-Star selection and won the Elite League (EIHL) play-offs, he joined Herning Blue Fox for the 2022–23 season.

After 2 seasons with Herning, Mac Carruth re-signed with the Cardiff Devils for the 2024-25 EIHL season

Carruth was suspended by Cardiff Devils on March 20, 2025 as a result of his behaviour towards a Nottingham Panthers fan in the aftermath of the Elite League contest between the sides.

Ahead of the 2025-26 season, Carruth agreed terms with French Ligue Magnus side Dragons de Rouen.

== Career statistics ==
			Regular season									Playoffs
Season	Team	League	GP	W	L	T/OT	Min	GA	SO	GAA	SV%	GP	W	L	Min	GA	SO	GAA	SV%
2008–09	Wenatchee Wild	NAHL	26	18	7	1	1462	74	1	3.04	.904	5	2	2	232	15	0	3.88	.864
2009–10	Wenatchee Wild	NAHL	16	11	4	0	866	35	1	2.42	.911	—	—	—	—	—	—	—	—
2009–10	Portland Winterhawks	WHL	26	14	9	1	1427	81	1	3.41	.893	11	5	4	614	39	0	3.81	.892
2010–11	Portland Winterhawks	WHL	48	31	13	1	2729	140	1	3.08	.913	21	13	8	1251	62	1	2.97	.919
2011–12	Portland Winterhawks	WHL	63	42	17	2	3592	177	2	2.96	.904	22	15	7	1328	64	2	2.89	.918
2012–13	Portland Winterhawks	WHL	39	30	7	2	2275	78	7	2.06	.929	21	16	5	1254	34	5	1.63	.937
2013–14	Toledo Walleye	ECHL	25	8	15	0	1357	76	1	3.36	.898	—	—	—	—	—	—	—	—
2013–14	Rockford IceHogs	AHL	7	2	2	1	375	21	0	3.36	.880	—	—	—	—	—	—	—	—
2013–14	Florida Everblades	ECHL	7	2	4	1	418	24	1	3.45	.874	—	—	—	—	—	—	—	—
2014–15	Indy Fuel	ECHL	39	17	13	7	2309	98	3	2.55	.914	—	—	—	—	—	—	—	—
2014–15	Rockford IceHogs	AHL	3	2	1	0	177	5	1	1.69	.925	1	0	1	34	2	0	3.51	.867
2015–16	Indy Fuel	ECHL	25	12	10	3	1429	58	1	2.43	.918	—	—	—	—	—	—	—	—
2015–16	Rockford IceHogs	AHL	17	6	5	2	860	33	2	2.30	.926	3	0	3	172	13	0	4.53	.854
2016–17	Rockford IceHogs	AHL	24	5	11	8	1171	71	0	3.64	.879	—	—	—	—	—	—	—	—
2017–18	Fehérvár AV19	EBEL	40	—	—	—	2369	106	0	2.68	.927	—	—	—	—	—	—	—	—
2018–19	Fehérvár AV19	EBEL	49	—	—	—	2894	160	0	3.32	.899	6	—	—	—	—	—	3.47	.910
2019–20	Lausitzer Füchse	DEL2	43	—	—	—	—	—	2	2.98	.920	—	—	—	—	—	—	—	—
2020–21	Lausitzer Füchse	DEL2	38	—	—	—	—	—	0	3.10	.911	—	—	—	—	—	—	—	—
2021–22	Cardiff Devils	EIHL	41	24	16	0	—	—	5	2.16	.937	4	3	1	—	9	1	2.26	.926
2022–23	Herning Blue Fox	Metal Ligaen	46	–	–	–	2707	93	–	2.06	.924
2023–24	Herning Blue Fox	Metal Ligaen	36	23	11	0	2120	92	–	2.60	.899
AHL totals			51	15	19	11	2583	130	3	3.02	.898	4	0	4	206	15	0	3.97	.860

== Awards and honours ==
Honours	Year
WHL First All-Star Team	2012–13
ECHL January Goalie of the Month	2014–15
EIHL Second All-Star Team	2021–22
