= Chris St. Croix =

American ice hockey player

- Born: May 2, 1979 (age 47) Voorhees, New Jersey, U.S.
- Height: 6 ft 03 in (191 cm)
- Weight: 200 lb (91 kg; 14 st 4 lb)
- Position: Defense
- Shot: Right
- Played for: AHL; Saint John Flames; Hartford Wolf Pack; Manitoba Moose; Iowa Chops; ECHL; Columbia Inferno; Las Vegas Wranglers; Elmira Jackals; CHL; Bossier-Shreveport Mudbugs
- NHL draft: 92nd overall, 1997; Calgary Flames
- Playing career: 1999–2010

Chris St. Croix (born May 2, 1979) is an American former ice hockey defenseman. He last played in the Central Hockey League during the 2009–10 CHL season with the Bossier-Shreveport Mudbugs.

St. Croix has been a resident of Voorhees Township, New Jersey. His father is former NHL goaltender Rick St. Croix and his younger brother is Edmonton Oil Kings forward Michael St. Croix.

St. Croix was drafted by the Calgary Flames in the 4th round of the 1997 NHL entry draft, but did not play in the NHL.

St. Croix resides in Winnipeg.

== Career statistics ==
			Regular season					Playoffs
Season	Team	League	GP	G	A	Pts	PIM	GP	G	A	Pts	PIM
1995–96	Kamloops Blazers	WHL	61	4	5	9	29	13	0	2	2	4
1996–97	Kamloops Blazers	WHL	67	11	39	50	67	5	0	1	1	2
1997–98	Kamloops Blazers	WHL	46	3	13	16	51	7	1	1	2	6
1998–99	Kamloops Blazers	WHL	64	8	27	35	123	14	0	4	4	16
1999–00	Saint John Flames	AHL	75	5	16	21	51	3	0	1	1	2
2000–01	Saint John Flames	AHL	69	0	4	4	66	5	0	1	1	4
2001–02	Hartford Wolf Pack	AHL	73	0	10	10	67	10	0	1	1	10
2002–03	Columbia Inferno	ECHL	56	13	36	49	101	17	1	7	8	24
2002–03	Manitoba Moose	AHL	10	0	0	0	12	—	—	—	—	—
2003–04	Manitoba Moose	AHL	12	1	1	2	8	—	—	—	—	—
2003–04	Columbia Inferno	ECHL	40	7	26	33	46	4	0	3	3	0
2004–05	Bad Toelz EC	2.GBun	51	6	23	29	34	—	—	—	—	—
2005–06	Freiburg EHC	2.GBun	51	13	18	31	0	—	—	—	—	—
2006–07	Landshut Cannibals	2.GBun	45	14	16	30	0	—	—	—	—	—
2007–08	Landshut Cannibals	2.GBun	48	4	26	30	69	13	0	2	2	10
2008–09	Elmira Jackals	ECHL	8	1	2	3	4	—	—	—	—	—
2008–09	Iowa Chops	AHL	2	0	0	0	2	—	—	—	—	—
2008–09	Las Vegas Wranglers	ECHL	43	1	6	7	33	9	1	3	4	10
2008–09	Manitoba Moose	AHL	6	0	0	0	2	—	—	—	—	—
2009–10	Bossier-Shreveport Mudbugs	CHL	64	3	16	19	55	11	1	7	8	4
