= Chase De Leo =

American ice hockey player (born 1995)

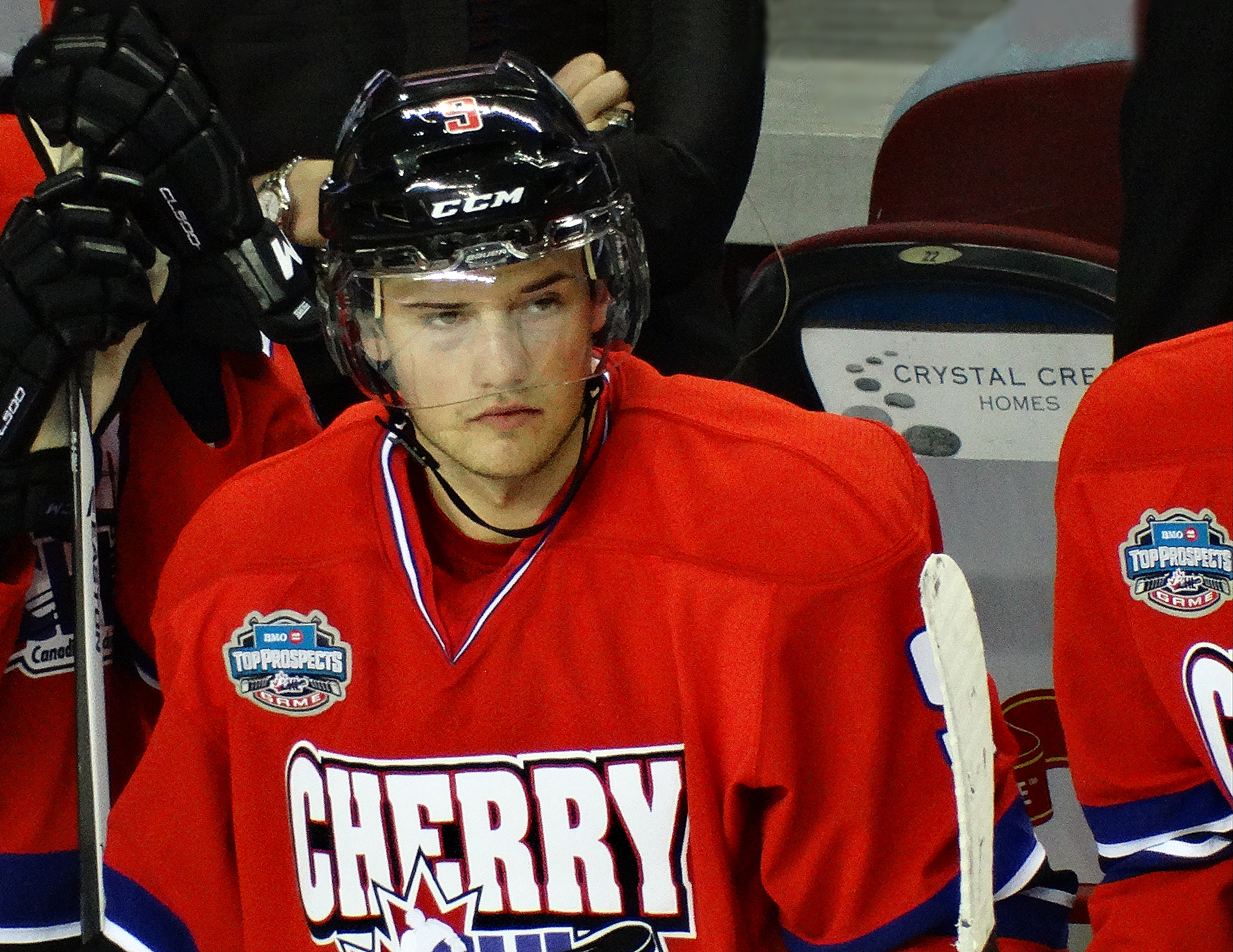
- De Leo in 2014
- Born: October 25, 1995 (age 30) La Mirada, California, U.S.
- Height: 5 ft 9 in (175 cm)
- Weight: 186 lb (84 kg; 13 st 4 lb)
- Position: Center
- Shoots: Left
- team Former teams: Free agent Winnipeg Jets; New Jersey Devils; Anaheim Ducks; Barys Astana; ZSC Lions
- NHL draft: 99th overall, 2014; Winnipeg Jets
- Playing career: 2015–present

Chase De Leo (born October 25, 1995) is an American professional ice hockey forward who is currently an unrestricted free agent. He most recently played for the Milwaukee Admirals of the American Hockey League (AHL). He has previously played for the Winnipeg Jets, Anaheim Ducks, and New Jersey Devils of the National Hockey League and Barys Astana of the Kontinental Hockey League.

== Personal life ==
De Leo was born on October 25, 1995, in La Mirada, California, U.S. to parents John and Janie who own a wholesale plumbing supply company. De Leo originally played baseball before being convinced to take up roller hockey due to his mom finding the former sport boring.

De Leo played roller hockey for the Orange County Blades before transitioned to ice hockey. He began playing as a goaltender for the Norwalk Knights before switching positions. As a youth, De Leo played for the Los Angeles Selects minor ice hockey team, where he was a teammate of Eric Comrie. While playing with this team, De Leo competed in the 2008 Quebec International Pee-Wee Hockey Tournament. After meeting Joe Sakic, Peter Forsberg, and Patrick Roy, De Leo chose to pursue ice hockey as a career.

== Playing career ==
De Leo played junior ice hockey for the Western Hockey League (WHL)'s Portland Winterhawks from 2011 to 2015. During those four seasons, his showed consistent improvement each season and finished his junior career with 251 points in 279 regular season games, which included back-to-back 39-goal seasons. He also tallied 58 points in 81 playoff games and was part of the Winterhawks 2013 WHL championship team that advanced to the Memorial Cup final.

The Winnipeg Jets of the National Hockey League (NHL) selected De Leo in the fourth round of the 2014 NHL entry draft. After completing his junior career in 2015, De Leo was assigned to the Manitoba Moose of the American Hockey League (AHL), the Jets' top minor league affiliate. He spent most of his first professional season with the Moose, but was briefly recalled by the Jets on March 20, 2016, to make his NHL debut on March 20 against the Anaheim Ducks. De Leo played one more game for the Jets before being returned to the AHL. De Leo spent the following two seasons entirely with the Moose in the AHL.

As an impending restricted free agent following the 2017–18 season, De Leo was traded by the Jets to the Anaheim Ducks in exchange for Nic Kerdiles on June 30, 2018. De Leo was assigned to their AHL affiliate, the San Diego Gulls to start the 2018–19 season, but was recalled in March 2019 and made his Ducks debut on March 30, 2019 against the Edmonton Oilers. That season with the Gulls, he set career-highs in goals (20) and points (55) while appearing in 66 games. During the 2019–20 season, De Leo set a new career-high three shorthanded goals and served as an alternate captain, a role he continued into the 2020–21 season with the Gulls.

Following three years within the Ducks organization, De Leo left as a free agent and was signed to a one-year, two-way contract with the New Jersey Devils on July 29, 2021. He was assigned to the Devils' AHL affiliate, the Utica Comets and led the team in scoring, with 21 goals and 56 points in 55 games. He was recalled in November and made his Devils debut on November 24, 2021 in a 3–2 loss to the Minnesota Wild.

After a lone season with the Devils, De Leo as a free agent opted to return to his former club, the Anaheim Ducks, by signing a two-year, two-way contract on July 14, 2022. He was assigned to the Gulls and was named the team's captain for the 2022–23 season. He scored nine goals and 23 points in 22 games for the Gulls. During the 2023–24 preseason, De Leo suffered a knee injury that kept him out until November 22. On that day, he was placed on waivers by Anaheim and after going unclaimed, was assigned to San Diego.

On September 7, 2024, De Leo went overseas, signing a one-year contract with Barys Astana in the Kontinental Hockey League (KHL). After finding themselves in last place in the KHL, Barys Astrana began releasing expensive foreign-born players from their contracts in an attempt to cut costs. De Leo had his contract terminated by the club after playing nine games with the team.

On October 28, 2024, De Leo joined the ZSC Lions of the National League (NL) for the remainder of the 2024–25 season. The "Zett" signed De Leo as a replacement for injured forward Rūdolfs Balcers and to occupy their seventh import spot. De Leo played four NL games (0 points) and two Champions Hockey League games (1 assist) with the team before being released on November 28. In returning to North America as a free agent, De Leo was later signed to a AHL contract for the remainder of the season with the Charlotte Checkers. Before he could join the Checkers, De Leo was subject to waivers because he began the season in Europe. On January 18, 2025, De Leo was claimed by the Milwaukee Admirals, affiliate to the Nashville Predators.

== International play ==
De Leo was a member of Team USA at the 2015 World Junior Ice Hockey Championships.

== Career statistics ==
=== Regular season and playoffs ===
			Regular season					Playoffs
Season	Team	League	GP	G	A	Pts	PIM	GP	G	A	Pts	PIM
2011–12	Portland Winterhawks	WHL	69	14	16	30	25	22	0	1	1	2
2012–13	Portland Winterhawks	WHL	71	18	38	56	24	21	5	12	17	15
2013–14	Portland Winterhawks	WHL	72	39	42	81	36	21	10	9	19	6
2014–15	Portland Winterhawks	WHL	67	39	45	84	30	17	7	12	19	10
2015–16	Manitoba Moose	AHL	73	19	21	40	34	—	—	—	—	—
2015–16	Winnipeg Jets	NHL	2	0	0	0	0	—	—	—	—	—
2016–17	Manitoba Moose	AHL	69	14	18	32	12	—	—	—	—	—
2017–18	Manitoba Moose	AHL	69	12	23	35	31	9	2	6	8	0
2018–19	San Diego Gulls	AHL	66	20	35	55	12	16	5	0	5	2
2018–19	Anaheim Ducks	NHL	1	0	0	0	0	—	—	—	—	—
2019–20	San Diego Gulls	AHL	51	10	15	25	16	—	—	—	—	—
2019–20	Anaheim Ducks	NHL	1	0	0	0	0	—	—	—	—	—
2020–21	San Diego Gulls	AHL	37	15	20	35	18	3	0	0	0	0
2020–21	Anaheim Ducks	NHL	1	0	0	0	0	—	—	—	—	—
2021–22	Utica Comets	AHL	55	21	35	56	18	5	1	2	3	2
2021–22	New Jersey Devils	NHL	2	0	0	0	0	—	—	—	—	—
2022–23	San Diego Gulls	AHL	22	9	14	23	10	—	—	—	—	—
2023–24	San Diego Gulls	AHL	52	15	33	48	16	—	—	—	—	—
2024–25	Barys Astana	KHL	9	0	0	0	0	—	—	—	—	—
2024–25	ZSC Lions	NL	4	0	0	0	0	—	—	—	—	—
2024–25	Milwaukee Admirals	AHL	34	6	10	16	2	8	3	2	5	2
NHL totals			7	0	0	0	0	—	—	—	—	—

=== International ===
Year	Team	Event	Result	GP	G	A	Pts	PIM
2015	United States	WJC	5th	5	1	0	1	0
Junior totals				5	1	0	1	0
