= Brenden Kichton =

Canadian ice hockey player (born 1992)

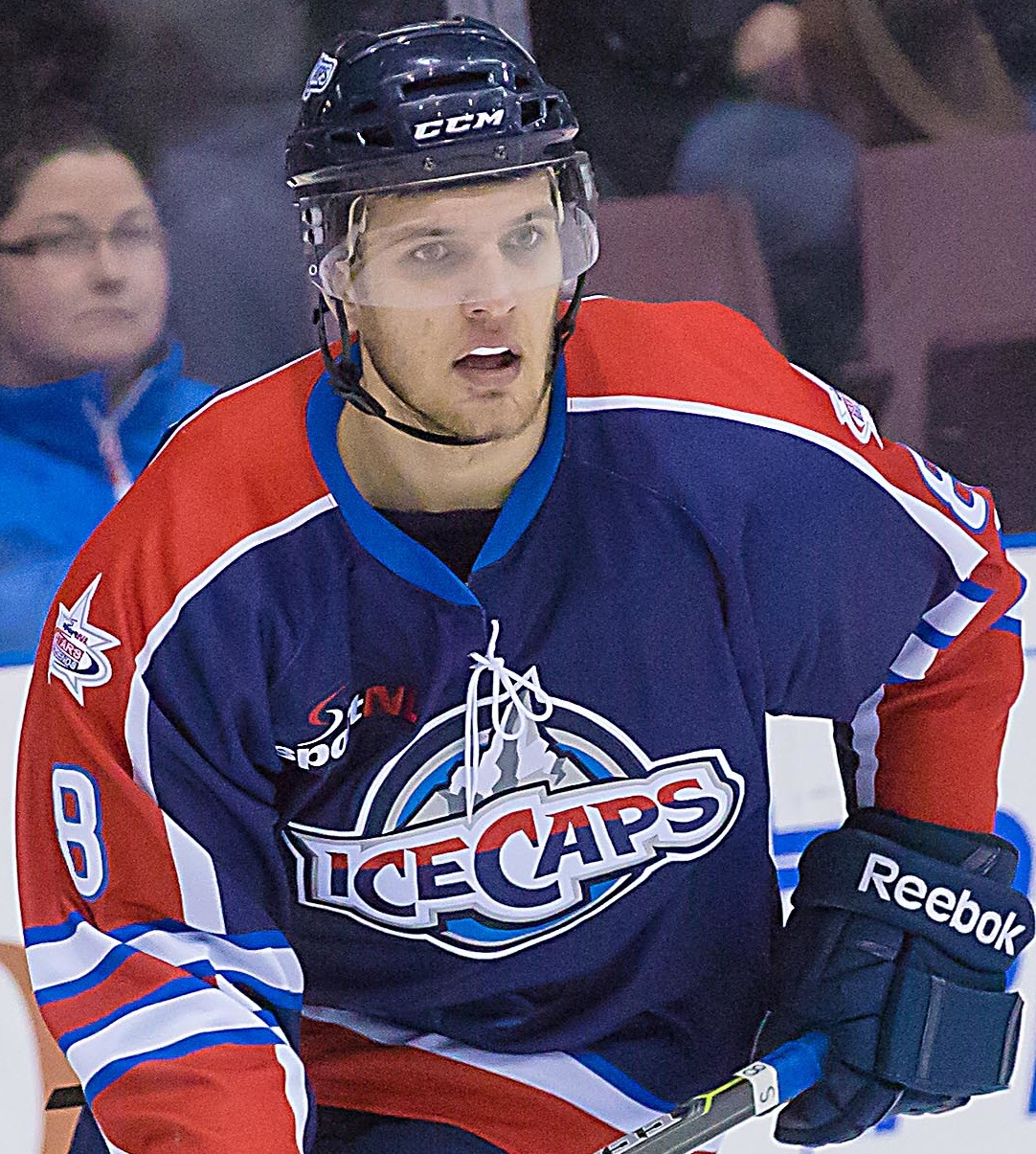
- Kichton with the St. John's IceCaps in 2015
- Born: June 18, 1992 (age 34) Spruce Grove, Alberta, Canada
- Height: 5 ft 11 in (180 cm)
- Weight: 185 lb (84 kg; 13 st 3 lb)
- Position: Defence
- Shot: Right
- Played for: St. John's IceCaps; Manitoba Moose; Charlotte Checkers; SaiPa; Vienna Capitals
- NHL draft: 127th overall, 2011; New York Islanders; 190th overall, 2013; Winnipeg Jets
- Playing career: 2013–2020

Brenden Kichton (born June 18, 1992) is a Canadian former professional ice hockey defenceman who played in the American Hockey League (AHL).

== Playing career ==
Kichton played junior hockey with the Spokane Chiefs in the Western Hockey League (WHL). Kichton was originally selected by the New York Islanders in the 5th round (127th overall) of the 2011 NHL entry draft. Unable to come to terms with the Islanders, Kichton was drafted 190th overall in the 2013 NHL entry draft by the Winnipeg Jets. Ironically, the draft pick the Islanders used for Kichton originally came from Winnipeg.

Kichton would start the 2013–14 season with the St. John's IceCaps of the American Hockey League (AHL). He led all AHL rookie defencemen in scoring and was named the CCM/AHL Rookie of the Month in January, after scoring 14 points in 12 games. Kichton played in the 2014 AHL All-Star Classic at Mile One Centre in St. John's, and was named to the AHL All-Rookie Team and won team award as IceCaps Rookie of the Year. He nearly made NHL Debut at penguins on February 27, 2016 but Late SCRATCH send down AHL After game On July 1, 2017, Kichton having left the Winnipeg Jets as a free agent, signed a one-year, two-way contract with the Carolina Hurricanes.

On October 10, 2018, Kichton signed with SaiPa of the Finnish Liiga. In his debut season abroad in 2018–19, Kichton adapted quickly to the European ice, scoring from blueline with 8 goals and 23 points in 46 games with SaiPa.

On June 20, 2019, Kichton left SaiPa at the conclusion of his contract and continued his career in Europe by agreeing to a one-year deal with the Vienna Capitals of the EBEL.

== Career statistics ==
| | | | Regular season | | | | | Playoffs |
| Season | Team | League | GP | G | A | Pts | PIM | GP | G | A | Pts | PIM |
|---|---|---|---|---|---|---|---|---|---|---|---|---|
| 2008–09 | Spokane Chiefs | WHL | 57 | 1 | 8 | 9 | 12 | 8 | 0 | 0 | 0 | 0 |
| 2009–10 | Spokane Chiefs | WHL | 70 | 4 | 15 | 19 | 21 | 7 | 0 | 0 | 0 | 4 |
| 2010–11 | Spokane Chiefs | WHL | 64 | 23 | 58 | 81 | 31 | 17 | 1 | 10 | 11 | 2 |
| 2011–12 | Spokane Chiefs | WHL | 71 | 17 | 57 | 74 | 49 | 1 | 0 | 1 | 1 | 0 |
| 2012–13 | Spokane Chiefs | WHL | 71 | 22 | 63 | 85 | 30 | 9 | 2 | 5 | 7 | 6 |
| 2013–14 | St. John's IceCaps | AHL | 76 | 10 | 38 | 48 | 14 | 21 | 2 | 5 | 7 | 2 |
| 2014–15 | St. John's IceCaps | AHL | 65 | 8 | 21 | 29 | 32 | — | — | — | — | — |
| 2015–16 | Manitoba Moose | AHL | 68 | 11 | 30 | 41 | 36 | — | — | — | — | — |
| 2016–17 | Manitoba Moose | AHL | 63 | 1 | 22 | 23 | 52 | — | — | — | — | — |
| 2017–18 | Charlotte Checkers | AHL | 63 | 4 | 20 | 24 | 61 | 8 | 0 | 3 | 3 | 0 |
| 2018–19 | SaiPa | Liiga | 46 | 8 | 15 | 23 | 26 | 3 | 0 | 0 | 0 | 2 |
| 2019–20 | Vienna Capitals | EBEL | 36 | 13 | 17 | 30 | 20 | — | — | — | — | — |
| AHL totals | | | 335 | 34 | 131 | 165 | 195 | 29 | 2 | 8 | 10 | 2 |

== Awards and honours ==
| Award | Year |
WHL
| Western Conference Second All-Star Team | 2010–11 |
| Subway Super Series – All-Stars | 2011 |
| Bill Hunter Memorial Trophy Top Defenceman | 2012–13 |
AHL
| All-Rookie Team | 2013–14 |
