= Michael St. Croix =

Canadian ice hockey player

- Born: April 10, 1993 (age 33) Winnipeg, Manitoba, Canada
- Height: 5 ft 11 in (180 cm)
- Weight: 179 lb (81 kg; 12 st 11 lb)
- Position: Centre
- Shot: Right
- Played for: Hartford Wolf Pack; Greenville Road Warriors; Greenville Swamp Rabbits
- NHL draft: 106th overall, 2011; New York Rangers
- Playing career: 2013–2020

Michael St. Croix (born April 10, 1993) is a Canadian former professional ice hockey player who last played for the Winkler Royals of the South Eastern Manitoba Hockey League. He formerly played for the Greenville Swamp Rabbits in the ECHL as a prospect of the New York Rangers organization. He was drafted by the Rangers in the fourth round of the 2011 NHL entry draft. As of 2011, he is the Oil Kings all-time leading scorer. His father is former NHL goaltender Rick St. Croix and his brother is former professional hockey defenseman Chris St. Croix.

== Playing career ==
=== Midget ===
St. Croix represented Team Western at the World U-17 Hockey Challenge in both 2009 as a 15-year-old and 2010 World U-17 Hockey Challenge as a 16-year-old, reaching the semifinal in 2009. In his final season in Midget AAA hockey, he led the Manitoba Midget AAA league in scoring with 103 points in 41 regular season games, and added 20 points in 9 playoff games.

=== Junior ===
Michael was drafted 4th overall by the Oil Kings in the 2008 bantam draft. He played two games for the Oil Kings in the 2008-09 season, scoring one goal and one assist for two points. In 2009-10, St. Croix played 66 games for young Oil Kings team that only won 16 games. He scored 18 goals and 28 points for 46 total points, leading the Oil Kings in both goals and points. In 2010-11, St. Croix and the Oil Kings were more successful. The Oil Kings made the playoffs and St. Croix scored 27 goals and 48 assists for 75 total points. His 48 assists led the team and set a modern franchise record, his 75 points placed second on the team and his 27 goals were third on the team. His 75 points also placed him 36th in the WHL and his 48 assists placed him 32nd. St. Croix also played in four playoff games, scoring one goal. As of 2011, he was the Oil Kings all-time leading scorer.

During the 2011-12 season, St. Croix was named the WHL Player of the Week for the week of November 28 to December 4, 2011, for scoring 3 goals and 5 assists with a +5 plus-minus rating in 3 games. He was beaten out by fellow New York Ranger draftee Christian Thomas for the honor of Canadian Hockey League player of the week for that week. St. Croix was later named the WHL Player of the Month for December 2011, for scoring 10 goals and 16 assists in 12 games with a +11 plus-minus rating during the month. St. Croix repeated as WHL Player of the Week for the week of January 16–22, 2012 for 6 goals and 4 assists in 3 games with a +7 plus-minus rating, including two hat tricks. He ended the regular season with 45 goals and 60 assists for a total of 105 points. The 105 points placed 8th overall in the WHL. His 45 goals ranked 7th in the league and his 60 assists ranked 9th. He also tied for 6th overall in the league with a +40 plus/minus rating. He was named to the WHL Eastern Conference second all star team. During the 2012 WHL playoffs, St. Croix finished tied for 6th in the league and 1st on the team with 19 points in 20 games, helping Edmonton win the WHL championship. In the deciding 7th game of the championship series, St. Croix scored a goal and an assist.

For the 2012-13 season, St. Croix finished 7th overall in WHL scoring with 37 goals and 55 assists for 92 total points. His 55 assists tied him for 9th in the league. He led the WHL with 20 power play goals. He was named Player of the Week by both the WHL and the Canadian Hockey League for the week of February 25 through March 3, 2013, scoring two goals and seven assists in three games, with a +5 plus-minus rating. For the season, he was named a WHL Eastern Conference First Team All-Star. In the postseason, he ranked 3rd in the WHL with 26 points. His 13 playoff goals ranked 2nd on the league and his 13 playoff assists ranked 9th.

=== Professional ===
St. Croix was the 106th pick in the 4th round of the 2011 NHL entry draft by the New York Rangers. He had been ranked as the 46th best prospect in the draft by The Hockey News, ahead of Rangers' first round draft pick J.T. Miller. The International Scouting Services ranked him as the 59th best prospect in the draft and Central Scouting ranked him as the 56th best North American skater. Central Scouting had ranked him 36th in their midseason rankings. Hockey Prospectus ranked him 26th overall.

On September 14, 2012 he signed a 3-year, two-way entry-level contract with a cap hit of $665,000. He began the 2013–14 season with the Greenville Road Warriors of the ECHL and scored a goal and an assist in his professional debut with Greenville on October 18, 2013. After scoring a goal and three assists in Greenville's first two games he was promoted to the Hartford Wolf Pack of the AHL. He split the season between Greenville and Hartford, scoring 17 goals and 31 assists in 52 games for Greenville, and going scoreless in 13 games for Hartford.

St. Croix became a free agent when his initial contract expired after the 2015-16 season and the Rangers relinquished their rights to him. St. Croix elected to attend the University of Manitoba and play hockey for the Manitoba Bisons for the 2017-18 season.

== Playing style ==
St. Croix regards his vision as his best asset as a player, allowing him to set up plays, complete passes with little space, and to make fancy plays with the puck, and also views his playmaking and hockey sense as key assets. He also positions himself well to take advantage of scoring opportunities. He tries to emulate Patrice Bergeron as a player.

== Career statistics ==
			Regular season					Playoffs
Season	Team	League	GP	G	A	Pts	PIM	GP	G	A	Pts	PIM
2008–09	Edmonton Oil Kings	WHL	2	1	1	2	0	—	—	—	—	—
2009–10	Edmonton Oil Kings	WHL	66	18	28	46	30	—	—	—	—	—
2010–11	Edmonton Oil Kings	WHL	68	27	48	75	48	4	1	0	1	9
2011–12	Edmonton Oil Kings	WHL	72	45	60	105	49	20	7	12	19	6
2012–13	Edmonton Oil Kings	WHL	72	37	55	92	36	22	13	13	26	14
2013–14	Hartford Wolf Pack	AHL	13	0	0	0	2	—	—	—	—	—
2013–14	Greenville Road Warriors	ECHL	53	17	31	48	12	—	—	—	—	—
2014–15	Greenville Road Warriors	ECHL	59	15	26	41	44	—	—	—	—	—
2015–16	Greenville Swamp Rabbits	ECHL	66	11	29	40	34	—	—	—	—	—
2017-18	Manitoba Bisons	U Sports	28	13	22	35	28	2	0	2	2	2
2019-20	Winkler Royals	SEMHL	12	11	17	28	4	1	0	0	0	0
AHL totals			13	0	0	0	2	—	—	—	—	—

== Awards and honours ==
- 2010–11 Mazda WHL Play of the Year (top spot with an "incredible one-handed goal" against the Vancouver Giants)
- WHL Player of the Week, November 28, 2011 to December 4, 2011
- WHL Player of the Month, December 2011
- WHL Player of the Week, January 16, 2012 to January 22, 2012
- WHL Eastern Conference Second Team All-Star, 2011–12
- WHL Player of the Week, February 25, 2013 to March 3, 2013
- Canadian Hockey League Player of the Week, February 25, 2013 to March 3, 2013
- WHL Eastern Conference First Team All-Star, 2012–2013
