= Brooks Macek =

Canadian-German ice hockey player

- Macek in 2026
- Born: May 15, 1992 (age 34) Winnipeg, Manitoba, Canada
- Height: 5 ft 11 in (180 cm)
- Weight: 181 lb (82 kg; 12 st 13 lb)
- Position: Centre
- Shoots: Right
- DEL team Former teams: Adler Mannheim; Iserlohn Roosters; EHC München; Avtomobilist Yekaterinburg
- National team: Germany
- NHL draft: 171st overall, 2010; Detroit Red Wings
- Playing career: 2013–present

Brooks Macek (born May 15, 1992) is a German-Canadian professional ice hockey centre. He is currently playing with Adler Mannheim of the Deutsche Eishockey Liga (DEL). Macek was picked by the Detroit Red Wings in the 2010 NHL entry draft in the 6th round, 171st overall.

== Playing career ==
Macek played for the Notre Dame Hounds at the Bantam AAA and Midget AAA level before entering the WHL in 2008. Macek would play a total of 319 WHL games until 2013, first representing the Tri-City Americans, followed by a stint with the Calgary Hitmen.

Following an outstanding 2012–13 season with the Calgary Hitmen, in which he served as an assistant captain and scored 32 goals in 70 games to go along with 48 assists in WHL play, Macek decided to accept an offer from Germany: In June 2013, he signed a two-year deal with the Iserlohn Roosters of the German top-flight Deutsche Eishockey Liga. In 2015, he had his contract renewed for the 2015–16 campaign. After three years with the Roosters and 154 DEL appearances with the team (51 goals, 61 assists) plus 22 playoff contests (nine goals, seven assists), Macek decided to move on. In May 2016, he signed with fellow DEL side EHC München. He scored 23 goals and assisted on 22 more en route to winning the 2017 German championship with München. In 2018, he won a second straight German championship. He tallied 34 goals and 25 assists in 67 games during the 2017-18 campaign.

On June 12, 2018, Macek signed a one-year deal (worth an NHL average annual value of $650,000 and an American Hockey League base salary of $175,000) with the Vegas Golden Knights of the NHL. In his first professional season in North America, Macek was assigned by the Golden Knights to American Hockey League (AHL) affiliate, the Chicago Wolves, for the duration of the 2018-19 season. He showed his offensive instincts, earning a top-line role in finishing third in scoring with 26 goals and 34 assists for 60 points in 64 games. He posted 5 goals in 17 playoff games as the Wolves reached the Calder Cup finals.

On June 21, 2019, Macek left the Vegas Golden Knights as an impending restricted free agent, agreeing to a one-year contract with Russian club, Avtomobilist Yekaterinburg of the Kontinental Hockey League (KHL).

After seven seasons with Yekaterinburg, Macek left the club as the franchise all-time leading goalscorer, and returned to Germany in signing a two-year contract with Adler Mannheim of the DEL, on 5 May 2026.

== International play ==
Medal record

Representing Germany

Ice hockey

Olympic Games
Silver medal – second place	2018 Pyeongchang	

A Canadian of German descent, Macek has dual citizenship in Canada and Germany (his father comes from Geldern, Germany) In November 2015, he landed a spot on the roster of Germany's national team for the Deutschland-Cup and made his debut for Team Germany against Switzerland during the tournament.

In 2016, he played his first World Championship with the German national team. At the 2018 Winter Olympics, he helped Germany win silver, which was the country's greatest ever international achievement.

== Career statistics ==
=== Regular season and playoffs ===
			Regular season					Playoffs
Season	Team	League	GP	G	A	Pts	PIM	GP	G	A	Pts	PIM
2007–08	Notre Dame Hounds AAA	SMHL	44	32	30	62	37	10	10	6	16	10
2008–09	Tri–City Americans	WHL	60	8	16	24	24	11	3	0	3	0
2009–10	Tri–City Americans	WHL	72	21	52	73	26	21	6	11	17	17
2010–11	Tri–City Americans	WHL	38	8	16	24	26	—	—	—	—	—
2010–11	Calgary Hitmen	WHL	25	5	12	17	10	—	—	—	—	—
2011–12	Calgary Hitmen	WHL	54	14	24	38	19	5	1	2	3	0
2012–13	Calgary Hitmen	WHL	70	32	48	80	30	17	6	8	14	8
2013–14	Iserlohn Roosters	DEL	50	13	21	34	6	9	5	1	6	2
2014–15	Iserlohn Roosters	DEL	52	17	22	39	4	7	1	3	4	0
2015–16	Iserlohn Roosters	DEL	52	21	18	39	28	6	3	3	6	4
2016–17	EHC Red Bull München	DEL	51	17	10	27	14	14	6	11	17	2
2017–18	EHC Red Bull München	DEL	50	26	18	44	10	17	8	7	15	4
2018–19	Chicago Wolves	AHL	64	26	34	60	12	17	5	1	6	8
2019–20	Avtomobilist Yekaterinburg	KHL	61	24	22	46	22	5	0	1	1	0
2020–21	Avtomobilist Yekaterinburg	KHL	57	17	11	28	38	5	2	1	3	6
2021–22	Avtomobilist Yekaterinburg	KHL	38	15	17	32	10	—	—	—	—	—
2022–23	Avtomobilist Yekaterinburg	KHL	64	36	17	53	16	7	2	3	5	2
2023–24	Avtomobilist Yekaterinburg	KHL	67	23	24	47	38	17	1	6	7	0
2024–25	Avtomobilist Yekaterinburg	KHL	68	26	22	48	12	7	1	2	3	0
2025–26	Avtomobilist Yekaterinburg	KHL	48	14	21	35	25	6	1	1	2	0
DEL totals			255	94	89	183	62	53	23	25	48	12
KHL totals			403	155	134	289	161	47	7	14	21	8

=== International ===
Year	Team	Event	Result	GP	G	A	Pts	PIM
2009	Canada Western	U17	4th	6	3	2	5	2
2016	Germany	OGQ	Q	3	1	2	3	0
2016	Germany	WC	7th	8	3	1	4	2
2017	Germany	WC	8th	8	2	0	2	0
2018	Germany	OG	2nd place, silver medalist(s)	7	2	2	4	2
Junior totals				6	3	2	5	2
Senior totals				26	8	5	13	4
