= Jordon Cooke =

Canadian ice hockey player

- Born: June 6, 1993 (age 33) Leduc, Alberta, Canada
- Height: 5 ft 10 in (178 cm)
- Weight: 176 lb (80 kg; 12 st 8 lb)
- Position: Goaltender
- Caught: Right
- Played for: Rapaces de Gap
- NHL draft: Undrafted
- Playing career: 2018–2021

Jordon Cooke (born June 6, 1993) is a Canadian ice hockey goaltender. Cooke was selected by the Kelowna Rockets in the fourth round (79th overall) of the 2008 WHL Bantam Draft.

Cooke's outstanding season with the Kelowna Rockets during the 2013–14 WHL season was recognized when he was selected the WHL's Western Conference Goaltender of the Year and was named to the WHL's Western Conference First All-Star Team. In addition, on May 26, 2014, Cooke was also named CHL Goalie of the Year.

On July 3, 2014, it was announced that Cooke would be attending the LA Kings Development Camp held at the Toyota Sports Center beginning on July 7, 2014.

On December 20, 2014, Cooke was added to the 2016 Spengler Cup Team Canada roster, making him the first active player from Canada West Universities Athletic Association to be named to Canada’s Spengler Cup roster in over 30 years. Despite not playing in any games, Cooke won gold with the team as the third-string goalie, behind Zachary Fucale and Drew MacIntyre.

== Awards and honours ==
Honours	Year
WHL Second All-Star Team (West)	2012–13
WHL First All-Star Team (West)	2013–14
WHL Del Wilson Trophy (Top Goaltender)	2013–14
CHL Goaltender of the Year	2013–14
CWUAA Most Outstanding Player	2015–16
CIS First All-Star Team (West)	2015–16
CIS All-Canadian First Team	2015–16
CIS Goaltender of the Year	2015–16
Spengler Cup Gold medal	2016
U Sports All-Canadian First Team	2016–17
U Sports Goaltender of the Year	2016–17
