= Travis Ewanyk =

Canadian professional ice hockey player

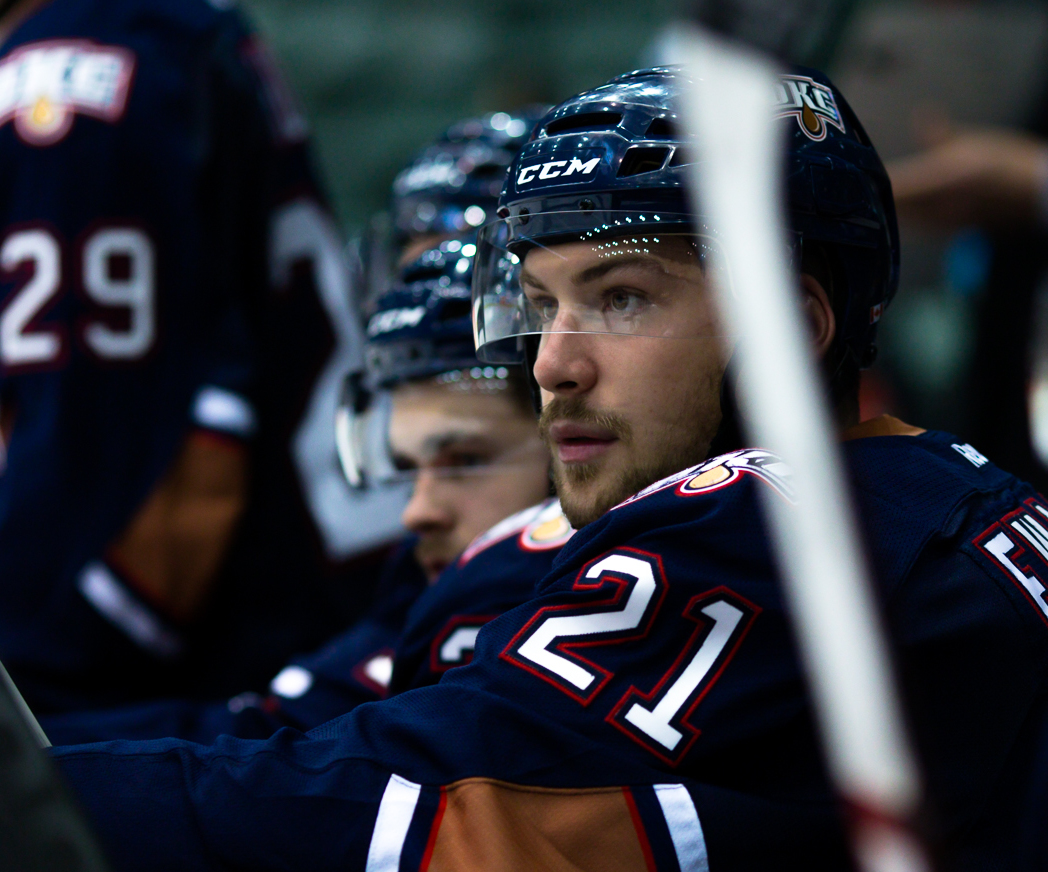
- Ewanyk with the Oklahoma City Barons in 2014
- Born: March 29, 1993 (age 33) St. Albert, Alberta, Canada
- Height: 6 ft 1 in (185 cm)
- Weight: 198 lb (90 kg; 14 st 2 lb)
- Position: Centre
- Shoots: Left
- EIHL team Former teams: Dundee Stars; Oklahoma City Barons; Binghamton Senators; Texas Stars; Krefeld Pinguine; Eispiraten Crimmitschau; Iserlohn Roosters; Bayreuth Tigers; UTE; Starbulls Rosenheim; EHC Freiburg
- NHL draft: 74th overall, 2011; Edmonton Oilers
- Playing career: 2013–present

Travis Ewanyk (born March 29, 1993) is a Canadian professional ice hockey centre currently playing for Dundee Stars of the EIHL.

== Playing career ==
Before turning professional, Ewanyk played in the junior Western Hockey League with Edmonton Oil Kings. He was drafted 74th overall by the Edmonton Oilers in the 2011 NHL entry draft after his second season with the Oil Kings. He played two more seasons for the Oil Kings before signing a three-year entry-level contract with the Oilers.

Ewanyk spent two seasons with the Oilers' American Hockey League affiliate the Oklahoma City Barons before he was traded to the Ottawa Senators for Eric Gryba. He spent just one season with the Senators' AHL affiliate the Binghamton Senators before becoming a free agent. With no NHL interest, Ewanyk signed for the Idaho Steelheads of the ECHL on October 12, 2016. He also played one game for the AHL's Texas Stars during the 2016-17 season. He also had spells with the Fort Wayne Komets and the Wichita Thunder.

On August 29, 2018, Ewanyk moved to Europe and signed with the Krefeld Pinguine of the Deutsche Eishockey Liga (DEL). He signed a new one-year contract with Krefeld on April 3, 2019.

Over the next seven seasons, Ewanyk continued his career across Europe. He played predominantly in Germany for several DEL and DEL2 clubs, including Eispiraten Crimmitschau, Iserlohn Roosters, Bayreuth Tigers, Starbulls Rosenheim, and EHC Freiburg, alongside a 2023–24 stint in Hungary with UTE.

Ahead of the 2026–27 season, Ewanyk signed with the Dundee Stars of the Elite Ice Hockey League (EIHL) on May 31, 2026.
