= 2010–11 WHL season =

- League: Western Hockey League
- Sport: Ice hockey
- Duration: Regular season September 24, 2010 – March 20, 2011; Playoffs; March 25 – May 13, 2011
- Teams: 22
- TV partner(s): Shaw TV, Rogers Sportsnet

Regular season
- Scotty Munro Memorial Trophy: Saskatoon Blades (4)
- Season MVP: Darcy Kuemper (Red Deer Rebels)
- Top scorer: Linden Vey (Medicine Hat Tigers)

Playoffs
- Playoffs MVP: Nathan Lieuwen (Ice)
- Finals champions: Kootenay Ice (3)
- Runners-up: Portland Winterhawks

WHL seasons
- 2009–10 2011–12

2010–11 CHL season
- League: Canadian Hockey League
- Sport: Ice hockey
- Duration: OHL; 2010-09-23 – 2011-03-20; QMJHL; 2010-09-09 – 2011-03-20; WHL; 2010-09-24 – 2011-03-20
- Teams: 60
- TV partner(s): FSN Northwest, RDS, Rogers Sportsnet, Rogers TV, Shaw TV
- Season MVP: Ryan Ellis (Windsor Spitfires) (OHL)
- Top scorer: Linden Vey (Medicine Hat Tigers) (WHL)

Memorial Cup
- Finals champions: Saint John Sea Dogs (QMJHL) (1st title)
- Runners-up: Mississauga St. Michael's Majors (OHL)

The 2010–11 WHL season was the 45th season of the Western Hockey League (WHL). The regular season began on September 24, 2010, and ended on March 20, 2011. The 2010 Subway Super Series, featuring Team WHL versus Team Russia, took place mid-season from November 17 to 18, 2010. The Saskatoon Blades won their fourth Scotty Munro Memorial Trophy for best regular season record. The playoffs began on March 25, 2011, and concluded on May 13. The Kootenay Ice won the Ed Chynoweth Cup for the third time, defeating the Portland Winterhawks in the championship series. This earned Kootenay a berth in the 2011 Memorial Cup tournament.

On January 15, 2011, the Spokane Chiefs hosted the Kootenay Ice in the WHL's first ever outdoor game, played at Avista Stadium. On February 21, the defending champion Calgary Hitmen hosted the Regina Pats at McMahon Stadium for a second outdoor game, this one in conjunction with the National Hockey League's 2011 Heritage Classic.

The 2010–11 season was the first to be featured in an EA Sports NHL video game, with all teams and rosters appearing in NHL 11.

== Regular season ==
=== Standings ===
Map of WHL, 2007–08 to 2010–11
East Division
Central Division
BC Division
US Division

==== Conference standings ====
Eastern Conference
Pos	Team	Pld	W	L	OTL	SOL	GF	GA	Pts
1	x, z – Saskatoon Blades	72	56	13	1	2	310	213	115
2	x, z – Red Deer Rebels	72	48	16	4	4	268	159	104
3	x – Medicine Hat Tigers	72	46	18	4	4	265	196	100
4	x – Kootenay Ice	72	46	21	1	4	272	218	97
5	x – Moose Jaw Warriors	72	40	26	2	4	245	240	86
6	x – Brandon Wheat Kings	72	32	31	1	8	249	252	73
7	x – Edmonton Oil Kings	72	31	34	2	5	249	252	69
8	x – Prince Albert Raiders	72	31	36	2	3	247	283	67
9	Lethbridge Hurricanes	72	23	36	5	8	205	295	59
10	Regina Pats	72	23	39	7	3	216	312	56
11	Swift Current Broncos	72	26	44	0	2	181	260	54
12	Calgary Hitmen	72	20	47	3	2	171	271	45

x – clinched playoff spot; z – clinched division

Western Conference
Pos	Team	Pld	W	L	OTL	SOL	GF	GA	Pts
1	x, z – Portland Winterhawks	72	50	19	0	3	303	227	103
2	x, z – Kelowna Rockets	72	43	28	0	1	240	201	87
3	x – Spokane Chiefs	72	48	18	4	2	310	193	102
4	x – Tri-City Americans	72	44	24	2	2	286	223	92
5	x – Vancouver Giants	72	35	32	1	4	236	251	75
6	x – Chilliwack Bruins	72	33	31	4	4	227	255	74
7	x – Prince George Cougars	72	33	35	2	2	258	265	70
8	x – Everett Silvertips	72	28	33	7	4	172	218	67
9	Kamloops Blazers	72	29	37	3	3	219	285	64
10	Seattle Thunderbirds	72	27	35	5	5	195	264	64

x – clinched playoff spot; z – clinched division

==== Division standings ====
East Division
Pos	Team	Pld	W	L	OTL	SOL	GF	GA	Pts
1	y, x – Saskatoon Blades	72	56	13	1	2	310	213	115
2	x – Moose Jaw Warriors	72	40	26	2	4	245	240	86
3	x – Brandon Wheat Kings	72	32	31	1	8	249	252	73
4	x – Prince Albert Raiders	72	31	36	2	3	247	283	67
5	Regina Pats	72	23	39	7	3	216	312	56
6	Swift Current Broncos	72	26	44	0	2	181	260	54

x – clinched playoff spot; y – division leader

Central Division
Pos	Team	Pld	W	L	OTL	SOL	GF	GA	Pts
1	y, x – Red Deer Rebels	72	48	16	4	4	268	159	104
2	x – Medicine Hat Tigers	72	46	18	4	4	265	196	100
3	x – Kootenay Ice	72	46	21	1	4	272	218	97
4	x – Edmonton Oil Kings	72	31	34	2	5	249	252	69
5	Lethbridge Hurricanes	72	23	36	5	8	205	295	59
6	Calgary Hitmen	72	20	47	3	2	171	271	45

x – clinched playoff spot; y – division leader

B.C. Division
Pos	Team	Pld	W	L	OTL	SOL	GF	GA	Pts
1	x, z – Kelowna Rockets	72	43	28	0	1	240	201	87
2	x – Vancouver Giants	72	35	32	1	4	236	251	75
3	x – Chilliwack Bruins	72	33	31	4	4	227	255	74
4	x – Prince George Cougars	72	33	35	2	2	258	265	70
5	Kamloops Blazers	72	29	37	3	3	219	285	64

x – clinched playoff spot; z – clinched division

U.S. Division
Pos	Team	Pld	W	L	OTL	SOL	GF	GA	Pts
1	x, z – Portland Winterhawks	72	50	19	0	3	303	227	103
2	x – Spokane Chiefs	72	48	18	4	2	310	193	102
3	x – Tri-City Americans	72	44	24	2	2	286	223	92
4	x – Everett Silvertips	72	28	33	7	4	172	218	67
5	Seattle Thunderbirds	72	27	35	5	5	195	264	64

x – clinched playoff spot; z – clinched division

=== Statistical leaders ===
==== Scoring leaders ====
Players are listed by points, then goals.

Note: GP = Games played; G = Goals; A = Assists; Pts. = Points; PIM = Penalty minutes

Player	Team	GP	G	A	Pts.	PIM
Linden Vey	Medicine Hat Tigers	69	46	70	116	36
Tyler Johnson	Spokane Chiefs	71	53	62	115	48
Mark Stone	Brandon Wheat Kings	71	37	69	106	28
Ryan Nugent-Hopkins	Red Deer Rebels	69	31	75	106	51
Jordan Weal	Regina Pats	72	43	53	96	70
Brendan Shinnimin	Tri-City Americans	60	34	62	96	84
Ryan Johansen	Portland Winterhawks	63	40	52	92	64
Brendan Gallagher	Vancouver Giants	66	44	47	91	108
Scott Glennie	Brandon Wheat Kings	70	35	56	91	58
Marek Viedenský	Saskatoon Blades	63	36	52	88	52

==== Leading goaltenders ====
These are goaltenders that lead the league in GAA that played at least 900 minutes.

Note: GP = Games played; Mins = Minutes played; W = Wins; L = Losses; OTL = Overtime losses; SOL = Shootout losses; SO = Shutouts; GAA = Goals against average; Sv% = Save percentage

Player	Team	GP	Mins	W	L	OTL	SOL	SO	GAA	Sv%
Darcy Kuemper	Red Deer Rebels	62	3685	45	12	3	2	13	1.86	.933
Mac Engel	Spokane Chiefs	32	1484	13	8	2	1	4	2.30	.909
Tyler Bunz	Medicine Hat Tigers	56	3350	35	13	4	4	3	2.47	.919
James Reid	Spokane Chiefs	50	2808	35	9	2	1	4	2.52	.904
Adam Brown	Kelowna Rockets	60	3428	36	22	0	1	3	2.59	.916

== Players ==
=== 2010 NHL entry draft ===
In total, 40 WHL players were selected at the 2010 NHL entry draft.

1st Round
#	Nat.	Player	WHL team	NHL team
4	(Canada)	Ryan Johansen	Portland Winterhawks	Columbus Blue Jackets
5	(Switzerland)	Nino Niederreiter	Portland Winterhawks	New York Islanders
6	(Canada)	Brett Connolly	Prince George Cougars	Tampa Bay Lightning
10	(Canada)	Dylan McIlrath	Moose Jaw Warriors	New York Rangers
23	(Canada)	Mark Pysyk	Edmonton Oil Kings	Buffalo Sabres
25	(Canada)	Quinton Howden	Moose Jaw Warriors	Florida Panthers
29	(United States)	Emerson Etem	Medicine Hat Tigers	Anaheim Ducks

2nd Round
#	Nat.	Player	WHL team	NHL team
39	(Canada)	Brett Bulmer	Kelowna Rockets	Minnesota Wild
43	(Canada)	Bradley Ross	Portland Winterhawks	Toronto Maple Leafs
48	(Canada)	Curtis Hamilton	Saskatoon Blades	Edmonton Oilers
49	(Canada)	Calvin Pickard	Seattle Thunderbirds	Colorado Avalanche
58	(Canada)	Kent Simpson	Everett Silvertips	Chicago Blackhawks

3rd Round
#	Nat.	Player	WHL team	NHL team
64	(Canada)	Maxwell Reinhart	Kootenay Ice	Calgary Flames
66	(Czech Republic)	Radko Gudas	Everett Silvertips	Tampa Bay Lightning
70	(Canada)	Jordan Weal	Regina Pats	Los Angeles Kings
73	(Canada)	Joey Leach	Kootenay Ice	Calgary Flames
75	(Canada)	Kevin Sundher	Chilliwack Bruins	Buffalo Sabres
78	(United States)	Taylor Aronson	Portland Winterhawks	Nashville Predators
83	(Canada)	Matt MacKenzie	Calgary Hitmen	Buffalo Sabres

4th Round
#	Nat.	Player	WHL team	NHL team
97	(Canada)	Craig Cunningham	Vancouver Giants	Boston Bruins
109	(Canada)	Alex Theriau	Everett Silvertips	Dallas Stars

5th Round
#	Nat.	Player	WHL team	NHL team
121	(Canada)	Tyler Bunz	Medicine Hat Tigers	Edmonton Oilers
124	(Canada)	Austin Madaisky	Kamloops Blazers	Columbus Blue Jackets
133	(Canada)	Mike Ferland	Brandon Wheat Kings	Calgary Flames
134	(Canada)	Cody Beach	Calgary Hitmen	St. Louis Blues
137	(Canada)	Troy Rutkowski	Portland Winterhawks	Colorado Avalanche
139	(United States)	Luke Walker	Portland Winterhawks	Colorado Avalanche
147	(Canada)	Brendan Gallagher	Vancouver Giants	Montreal Canadiens

6th Round
#	Nat.	Player	WHL team	NHL team
155	(Canada)	Kendall McFaull	Moose Jaw Warriors	Atlanta Thrashers
162	(Canada)	Brandon Davidson	Regina Pats	Edmonton Oilers
166	(Canada)	Drew Czerwonka	Kootenay Ice	Edmonton Oilers
167	(Canada)	Tyler Stahl	Chilliwack Bruins	Carolina Hurricanes
178	(Canada)	Mark Stone	Brandon Wheat Kings	Ottawa Senators

7th Round
#	Nat.	Player	WHL team	NHL team
182	(Canada)	Josh Nicholls	Saskatoon Blades	Toronto Maple Leafs
186	(Canada)	Teigan Zahn	Saskatoon Blades	Tampa Bay Lightning
189	(Canada)	Dylan McKinlay	Chilliwack Bruins	Minnesota Wild
190	(Canada)	Randy McNaught	Saskatoon Blades	New York Rangers
191	(United States)	Macmillan Carruth	Portland Winterhawks	Chicago Blackhawks
193	(Canada)	Patrick Holland	Tri-City Americans	Calgary Flames
208	(Canada)	Riley Boychuk	Portland Winterhawks	Buffalo Sabres
209	(Canada)	Brendan Ranford	Kamloops Blazers	Philadelphia Flyers

=== Transactions ===
2010–11 WHL trades
Date	Deal made	
July 26, 2010	Red Deer Rebels	Everett Silvertips
July 26, 2010	Landon Ferraro →	← Byron Froese ← 3rd Round pick in 2012
July 27, 2010	Prince Albert Raiders	Medicine Hat Tigers
July 27, 2010	Ryan Harrison →	← Austin Bourhis ← Todd Fiddler
July 30, 2010	Vancouver Giants	Kamloops Blazers
July 30, 2010	JT Barnett →	← 2nd Round Pick in 2011
August 9, 2010	Swift Current Broncos	Prince George Cougars
August 9, 2010	Morgan Clark →	← 7th Round Pick in 2011 (conditional)
August 10, 2010	Kelowna Rockets	Moose Jaw Warriors
August 10, 2010	Collin Bowman →	← Kevin Smith
August 10, 2010	Prince Albert Raiders	Kelowna Rockets
August 10, 2010	Brendon Wall →	← 7th Round Pick in 2011 (conditional)
August 17, 2010	Spokane Chiefs	Prince George Cougars
August 17, 2010	6th Round Pick in 2011 (conditional) →	← Bruin McDonald
September 1, 2010	Prince Albert Raiders	Regina Pats
September 1, 2010	Colin Reddin →	← 6th Round Pick in 2011 (conditional)
September 7, 2010	Saskatoon Blades	Prince George Cougars
September 7, 2010	Charles Inglis →	← 2nd Round Pick in 2011
September 16, 2010	Vancouver Giants	Prince George Cougars
September 16, 2010	Brandon Scholten →	← 5th Round Pick in 2012
September 16, 2010	Medicine Hat Tigers	Vancouver Giants
September 16, 2010	Tanner Sohn →	← 6th Round Pick in 2012
September 17, 2010	Everett Silvertips	Moose Jaw Warriors
September 17, 2010	Thomas Heemskerk→	← Chad Suer
September 17, 2010	Moose Jaw Warriors	Kamloops Blazers
September 17, 2010	Jeff Bosch→	← 6th Round Pick in 2011
September 22, 2010	Swift Current Broncos	Seattle Thunderbirds
September 22, 2010	Travis Bobbee → conditional pick in 2012 →	← Brenden Silvester ← Tanner Muth
September 22, 2010	Edmonton Oil Kings	Vancouver Giants
September 22, 2010	Michael Burns →	← Landon Robins
September 24, 2010	Moose Jaw Warriors	Chilliwack Bruins
September 24, 2010	Mike Forsyth →	← 13th Round Pick in 2011 (conditional)
September 24, 2010	Moose Jaw Warriors	Regina Pats
September 24, 2010	Thomas Frazee → 4th Round Pick in 2011 → 6th Round Pick in 2012 →	← 2nd Round Pick in 2011 ← 5th Round Pick in 2013
September 24, 2010	Medicine Hat Tigers	Regina Pats
September 24, 2010	Trent Oullette →	← 7th Round Pick in 2012
September 27, 2010	Prince Albert Raiders	Chilliwack Bruins
September 27, 2010	Marc MacKenzie →	← 12th Round Pick in 2011
October 3, 2010	Saskatoon Blades	Prince George Cougars
October 3, 2010	Sena Acolatse →	← 3rd Round Pick in 2011
October 5, 2010	Lethbridge Hurricanes	Everett Silvertips
October 5, 2010	Brennan Yadlowski →	← 2nd Round Pick in 2011 ← 5th Round Pick in 2012
October 6, 2010	Prince George Cougars	Regina Pats
October 6, 2010	Art Bidlevskii →	← Cody Carlson
October 7, 2010	Vancouver Giants	Swift Current Broncos
October 7, 2010	Derek Tendler →	← 6th Round Pick in 2011
October 8, 2010	Regina Pats	Swift Current Broncos
October 8, 2010	Killian Hutt →	← 6th Round Pick in 2013
October 8, 2010	Regina Pats	Swift Current Broncos
October 8, 2010	6th Round Pick in 2013 →	← Juraj Roznik
October 8, 2010	Regina Pats	Brandon Wheat Kings
October 8, 2010	Hampus Gustafsson →	← 6th Round Pick in 2013
October 10, 2010	Regina Pats	Brandon Wheat Kings
October 10, 2010	Dominick Favreau →	← Mark Schneider
October 14, 2010	Calgary Hitmen	Tri-City Americans
October 14, 2010	Zak Stebner →	← 3rd Round Pick in 2011
October 14, 2010	Brandon Wheat Kings	Kamloops Blazers
October 14, 2010	Jesse Sinatynski →	← 5th Round Pick in 2011
October 15, 2010	Vancouver Giants	Prince Albert Raiders
October 15, 2010	RJ Reed →	← 7th Round Pick in 2012
October 18, 2010	Brandon Wheat Kings	Prince George Cougars
October 18, 2010	Ty Rimmer →	← 6th Round Pick in 2012
October 18, 2010	Kamloops Blazers	Saskatoon Blades
October 18, 2010	Jake Trask →	← 6th Round Pick in 2012
October 20, 2010	Seattle Thunderbirds	Swift Current Broncos
October 20, 2010	Ryan Aasman →	← 5th Round Pick in 2012
October 26, 2010	Spokane Chiefs	Chilliwack Bruins
October 26, 2010	TC Cratsenberg →	← 8th Round Pick in 2012 (conditional)
November 2, 2010	Chilliwack Bruins	Saskatoon Blades
November 2, 2010	Chris Collins →	← Curt Gogol ← 8th Round Pick in 2011
November 4, 2010	Edmonton Oil Kings	Kamloops Blazers
November 4, 2010	Cam Lanigan →	← Jon Groenheyde
November 11, 2010	Moose Jaw Warriors	Saskatoon Blades
November 11, 2010	Connor Cox →	← 2nd Round Pick in 2011
November 11, 2010	Moose Jaw Warriors	Vancouver Giants
November 11, 2010	Brendan Rowinski →	← 3rd Round Pick in 2012 ← 6th Round Pick in 2013
November 15, 2010	Red Deer Rebels	Regina Pats
November 15, 2010	Lane Scheidl →	← Dawson Guhle
November 16, 2010	Calgary Hitmen	Moose Jaw Warriors
November 16, 2010	Cody Beach → Mackenzie Royer →	← Danny Gayle ← Nathan MacMaster ← Brandon Glover
November 18, 2010	Kelowna Rockets	Prince Albert Raiders
November 18, 2010	Antoine Corbin →	← 3rd Round Pick in 2012
November 25, 2010	Chilliwack Bruins	Prince Albert Raiders
November 25, 2010	Cole Holowenko →	← Emerson Hrynyk
December 7, 2010	Tri-City Americans	Kelowna Rockets
December 7, 2010	Zak Stebner → 7th Round Pick in 2011 →	← 4th Round Pick in 2011 ← 8th Round Pick in 2012
December 7, 2010	Tri-City Americans	Everett Silvertips
December 7, 2010	Zach McPhee →	← Paul Sohor
December 9, 2010	Lethbridge Hurricanes	Vancouver Giants
December 9, 2010	Mark Reners →	← 5th Round Pick in 2012
December 10, 2010	Regina Pats	Tri-City Americans
December 10, 2010	Carter Ashton → 3rd Round Pick in 2012 →	← Tanner Olstad ← Nils Moser ← 1st Round Pick in 2011 ← 2nd Round Pick in 2012 ← 5th Round Pick in 2012
December 11, 2010	Saskatoon Blades	Lethbridge Hurricanes
December 11, 2010	Tyler Kizuik →	← 6th Round Pick in 2011
December 14, 2010	Regina Pats	Kamloops Blazers
December 14, 2010	Thomas Frazee →	← Shayne Neigum ← Lyndon Martell ← 3rd Round Pick in 2012
December 22, 2010	Edmonton Oil Kings	Swift Current Broncos
December 22, 2010	Graham Black →	← 8th Round Pick in 2011 (conditional)
December 28, 2010	Portland Winterhawks	Vancouver Giants
December 28, 2010	Spencer Bennett → Teal Burns → 1st Round Pick in 2011 → 2nd Round Pick in 2012 →	← Craig Cunningham ← 6th Round Pick in 2011
December 30, 2010	Swift Current Broncos	Vancouver Giants
December 30, 2010	Joel Rogers →	← Dalton Reum
January 4, 2011	Moose Jaw Warriors	Vancouver Giants
January 4, 2011	Nathan Smith →	← Brett Lyon
January 5, 2011	Brandon Wheat Kings	Vancouver Giants
January 5, 2011	Darren Bestland →	← Matt MacKay ← 4th Round Pick in 2012
January 7, 2011	Medicine Hat Tigers	Seattle Thunderbirds
January 7, 2011	4th Round Pick in 2012 (conditional) →	← Scott Ramsey
January 8, 2011	Edmonton Oil Kings	Vancouver Giants
January 8, 2011	5th Round Pick in 2012 →	← Mark Reners
January 9, 2011	Swift Current Broncos	Kootenay Ice
January 9, 2011	Cody Eakin →	← Christian Magnus ← Ryan Bloom ← Jarett Zentner ← Colby Cave ← Steven Myland ← 1st Round Pick in 2011 ← 2nd Round Pick in 2011 ← 3rd Round Pick in 2012
January 10, 2011	Prince Albert Raiders	Seattle Thunderbirds
January 10, 2011	Ryan Button →	← Charles Wells ← 1st Round Pick in 2011 (CHL Import Draft)
January 10, 2011	Brandon Wheat Kings	Saskatoon Blades
January 10, 2011	Brayden Schenn → 3rd Round Pick in 2012 →	← 1st Round Pick in 2011 ← 2nd Round Pick in 2011 ← 1st Round Pick in 2012 ← 1st Round Pick in 2012 (CHL Import Draft) ← Ayrton Nikkel ← Tim McGauley
January 10, 2011	Moose Jaw Warriors	Prince Albert Raiders
January 10, 2011	Michal Hlinka → 3rd Round Pick in 2011 → 6th Round Pick in 2011 →	← Sebastian Svendsen
January 10, 2011	Regina Pats	Seattle Thunderbirds
January 10, 2011	Mitch Spooner →	← 5th Round Pick in 2012 (conditional)
January 10, 2011	Vancouver Giants	Saskatoon Blades
January 10, 2011	Tanner Sohn →	← 10th Round Pick in 2013
January 10, 2011	Portland Winterhawks	Lethbridge Hurricanes
January 10, 2011	Branden Scheidl →	← Ryley Bennefield
January 10, 2011	Calgary Hitmen	Tri-City Americans
January 10, 2011	Matt MacKenzie →	← Brooks Macek ← Spencer Humphries ← 3rd Round Pick in 2012 (conditional)
January 10, 2011	Everett Silvertips	Medicine Hat Tigers
January 10, 2011	Kellan Tochkin → Alex Theriau →	← Ryan Harrison ← 2nd Round Pick in 2011

== Subway Super Series ==
The Subway Super Series was a six-game series featuring four teams: three from the Canadian Hockey League (CHL)—one team from each of the QMJHL, the OHL, and the WHL—versus Russia's national junior hockey team.

The 2010 series was held in six cities across Canada. The series began on November 8, 2010, and concluded on November 18, 2010. Both Western Hockey League games were held in British Columbia.

=== Results ===
Date	Location	Winner		Loser	
November 8, 2010	Saint John, New Brunswick	Russian Selects	5	4	QMJHL all-stars
November 10, 2010	Drummondville, Quebec	Russian Selects	4	3	QMJHL all-stars
November 11, 2010	London, Ontario	OHL all-stars	4	0	Russian Selects
November 15, 2010	Sudbury, Ontario	OHL all-stars	2	1	Russian Selects
November 17, 2010	Kamloops, British Columbia	Russian Selects	7	6	WHL all-stars
November 18, 2010	Prince George, British Columbia	Russian Selects	5	2	WHL all-stars
Russia wins series 4–2

== 2011 WHL Playoffs ==
Conference Quarter-finals	Conference Semi-finals
1	Saskatoon	4
8	Prince Albert	2
1	Saskatoon	0
4	Kootenay	4
4	Kootenay	4
5	Moose Jaw	2
Eastern
2	Red Deer	4
7	Edmonton	0
2	Red Deer	1
3	Medicine Hat	4
3	Medicine Hat	4
6	Brandon	2
1	Portland	4
8	Everett	0
1	Portland	4
2	Kelowna	2
2	Kelowna	4
7	Prince George	0
Western
3	Spokane	4
6	Chilliwack	1
3	Spokane	4
4	Tri-City	2
4	Tri-City	4
5	Vancouver	0

Conference Finals
4	Kootenay	4
3	Medicine Hat	0
1	Portland	4
3	Spokane	2

WHL Championship
E4	Kootenay	4
W1	Portland	1

== Conference Quarter-finals ==
=== Eastern Conference ===
==== (1) Saskatoon Blades vs. (8) Prince Albert Raiders ====
March 26	Saskatoon Blades	8 – 1	Prince Albert Raiders	Credit Union Centre	Recap
2:07 - Matěj Stránský (1); 13:56 - Brayden Schenn (1); 17:05 - Dalton Thrower (1)		First period	No scoring
4:46 - Stefan Elliott (1); 8:58 - Darren Dietz (1); 13:21 - Josh Nicholls (1); 16:55 - Brent Benson (1)		Second period	Todd Fiddler (1) - 3:33
13:09 - Dalton Thrower (2)		Third period	No scoring
Steven Stanford (33 saves / 34 shots)		Goalie stats	Jamie Tucker (24 saves / 31 shots); Eric Williams (13 saves / 14 shots)

March 27	Saskatoon Blades	5 – 2	Prince Albert Raiders	Credit Union Centre	Recap
13:21 - Brayden Schenn (2)		First period	No scoring
0:47 - Darian Dziurzynski (1); 13:01 - Josh Nicholls (2); 16:00 - pp - Brayden Schenn (3)		Second period	Shane Danyluk (1) - 5:03
4:31 - Curtis Hamilton (1)		Third period	Antoine Corbin (1) - pp - 7:58
Steven Stanford (31 saves / 33 shots)		Goalie stats	Eric Williams (31 saves / 36 shots)

March 30	Prince Albert Raiders	6 – 3	Saskatoon Blades	Art Hauser Centre	Recap
5:16 - Igor Revenko (1); 17:57 - Brandon Herrod (1)		First period	No scoring
4:46 - Jordan Rowley (1)		Second period	Josh Nicholls (3) - 0:41; Chris Collins (1) - 3:47
6:44 - Justin Maylan (1); 18:40 - Mark McNeill (1); 19:47 - en - Igor Revenko (2)		Third period	Matěj Stránský (2) - 10:33
Jamie Tucker (37 saves / 40 shots)		Goalie stats	Steven Stanford (44 saves / 49 shots)

March 31	Prince Albert Raiders	5 – 2	Saskatoon Blades	Art Hauser Centre	Recap
4:36 - Todd Fiddler (2); 11:41 - Todd Fiddler (3)		First period	Curtis Hamilton (2) - pp – 2:32
6:53 - pp - Igor Revenko (3)		Second period	No scoring
12:53 - TJ Constant (1); 19:50 - en - Mark McNeill (2)		Third period	Brayden Schenn (4) - 1:19
Jamie Tucker (28 saves / 30 shots)		Goalie stats	Steven Stanford (36 saves / 40 shots)

April 2	Saskatoon Blades	8 – 0	Prince Albert Raiders	Credit Union Centre	Recap
No scoring		First period	No scoring
0:23 - Curtis Hamilton (3); 9:46 - pp - Brayden Schenn (5); 12:07 - pp - Marek Viedenský (1); 14:30 - Darian Dziurzynski (2); 16:21 - pp - Jake Trask (1); 18:10 - pp - Duncan Siemens (1)		Second period	No scoring
4:35 - Curtis Hamilton (4); 18:05 - pp - Stefan Elliott (2)		Third period	No scoring
Steven Stanford (30 saves / 30 shots)		Goalie stats	Jamie Tucker (35 saves / 41 shots); Eric Williams (11 saves / 13 shots)

April 3	Prince Albert Raiders	1 – 2	OT	Saskatoon Blades	Art Hauser Centre	Recap
2:43 - Antoine Corbin (2)		First period		No scoring
No scoring		Second period		Brent Benson (2) - 12:21
No scoring		Third period		No scoring
No scoring		First overtime period		Matěj Stránský (3) - 4:24
Jamie Tucker (41 saves / 43 shots)		Goalie stats		Steven Stanford (33 saves / 34 shots)

Saskatoon wins Series 4 – 2

==== (2) Red Deer Rebels vs. (7) Edmonton Oil Kings ====
March 25	Red Deer Rebels	5 – 3	Edmonton Oil Kings	Enmax Centrium	Recap
6:32 - pp - Byron Froese (1); 12:20 - Brett Ferguson (1)		First period	Keegan Lowe (1) - 17:43
No scoring		Second period	Cameron Abney (1) - 15:43
8:20 - Andrej Kudrna (1); 14:25 - Ryan Nugent-Hopkins (1); 15:31 - pp - Ryan Nugent-Hopkins (2)		Third period	Michael St. Croix (1) - 11:08
Darcy Kuemper (34 saves / 37 shots)		Goalie stats	Jon Groenheyde (19 saves / 24 shots)

March 26	Red Deer Rebels	5 – 1	Edmonton Oil Kings	Enmax Centrium	Recap
10:39 - Ryan Nugent-Hopkins (3); 17:44 - Daulton Siwak (1)		First period	Jordan Hickmott (1) - 19:02
14:05 - sh - Adam Kambeitz (1)		Second period	No scoring
12:38 - Justin Weller (1); 19:16 - pp - Adam Kambeitz (2)		Third period	No scoring
Darcy Kuemper (27 saves / 28 shots)		Goalie stats	Jon Groenheyde (23 saves / 28 shots)

March 28	Edmonton Oil Kings	1 – 3	Red Deer Rebels	Rexall Place	Recap
No scoring		First period	No scoring
No scoring		Second period	No scoring
1:45 - T.J. Foster (1)		Third period	Byron Froese (2) - pp - 10:19; Daulton Siwak (2) - 18:08; Byron Froese (3) - 18:28
Laurent Brossoit (25 saves / 28 shots)		Goalie stats	Darcy Kuemper (27 saves / 28 shots)

March 31	Edmonton Oil Kings	1 – 5	Red Deer Rebels	Rexall Place	Recap
No scoring		First period	No scoring
No scoring		Second period	Matt Dumba (1) - 5:52; Ryan Nugent-Hopkins (4) - 10:01; Andrej Kudrna (2) - pp - 11:40; Brett Ferguson (2) - 19:40
14:04 - Curtis Lazar (1)		Third period	Brett Ferguson (3) - en - 19:06
Laurent Brossoit (24 saves / 28 shots)		Goalie stats	Darcy Kuemper (21 saves / 22 shots)

Red Deer wins series 4 – 0

==== (3) Medicine Hat Tigers vs. (6) Brandon Wheat Kings ====
March 25	Medicine Hat Tigers	2 – 7	Brandon Wheat Kings	Medicine Hat Arena	Recap
18:59 - pp - Linden Vey (1)		First period	David Toews (1) - 5:44; Ryan Pulock (1) - pp - 10:55
No scoring		Second period	Hampus Gustafsson (1) - 4:25; Brenden Walker (1) - 11:44
8:23 - pp - Hunter Shinkaruk (1)		Third period	Shayne Wiebe (1) - pp - 5:58; Paul Ciarelli (1) - 14:47; Ryan Pulock (2) - pp - 17:31
Tyler Bunz (22 saves / 27 shots); Deven Dubyk (8 saves / 10 shots)		Goalie stats	Corbin Boes (33 saves / 35 shots)

March 26	Medicine Hat Tigers	5 – 2	Brandon Wheat Kings	Medicine Hat Arena	Recap
4:59 - Sebastian Owuya (1)		First period	Scott Glennie (1) - pp - 8:15
3:06 - Dylan Bredo (1); 12:24 - Boston Leier (1)		Second period	No scoring
11:25 - Cole Grbavac (1); 19:05 - en - Linden Vey (2)		Third period	Scott Glennie (2) - 5:54
Deven Dubyk (38 saves / 40 shots)		Goalie stats	Corbin Boes (18 saves / 22 shots)

March 28	Brandon Wheat Kings	6 – 3	Medicine Hat Tigers	MTS Centre	Recap
1:33 - pp - David Toews (2)		First period	No scoring
5:41 - Mark Stone (1); 11:36 - Shayne Wiebe (2)		Second period	Jace Coyle (1) - pp - 3:21; Cole Grbavac (2) - 6:30
2:54 - pp - Brenden Walker (2); 13:34 - Matt MacKay (1); 19:31 - en - Hampus Gustafsson (2)		Third period	Alex Theriau (1) - 5:54
Liam Liston (32 saves / 35 shots)		Goalie stats	Deven Dubyk (23 saves / 28 shots)

March 31	Brandon Wheat Kings	4 – 5	Medicine Hat Tigers	MTS Centre	Recap
4:01 - pp - Brodie Melnychuk (1); 5:59 - Tyrel Seaman (1); 12:47 - pp - Matt MacKay (2); 17:45 - pp - Shayne Wiebe (3)		First period	Linden Vey (3) - pp - 15:42; Kale Kessy (1) - 18:13
No scoring		Second period	No scoring
No scoring		Third period	Emerson Etem (1) - 0:18; Jace Coyle (2) - pp - 15:14; Linden Vey (4) - 19:35
Corbin Boes (33 saves / 38 shots)		Goalie stats	Deven Dubyk (25 saves / 29 shots)

April 2	Medicine Hat Tigers	9 – 5	Brandon Wheat Kings	Medicine Hat Arena	Recap
9:51 - Curtis Valk (1)		First period	No scoring
8:20 - pp - Linden Vey (5); 10:01 - Emerson Etem (2); 11:57 - Cole Grbavac (3); 12:52 - pp - Kale Kessy (2); 19:33 - Hunter Shinkaruk (2)		Second period	Michael Ferland (1) - 3:39; Matt MacKay (3) - 6:08; Shayne Wiebe (4) - 14:09
8:31 - Emerson Etem (3); 8:49 - Wacey Hamilton (1); 16:15 - Scott McKay (1)		Third period	Scott Glennie (3) - pp - 7:47; Brodie Melnychuk (2) - 11:02
Deven Dubyk (29 saves / 34 shots)		Goalie stats	Corbin Boes (30 saves / 39 shots)

April 4	Brandon Wheat Kings	5 – 7	Medicine Hat Tigers	MTS Centre	Recap
No scoring		First period	Emerson Etem (4) - 6:19; Kellan Tochkin (1) - pp - 17:19
2:01 - pp - Michael Ferland (2); 12:22 - Michael Ferland (3)		Second period	Wacey Hamilton (2) - 0:55; Kellan Tochkin (2) - pp - 6:20; Reid Petryk (1) - 7:28
10:12 - Michael Ferland (4); 12:52 - Tyrel Seaman (2); 14:19 - Paul Ciarelli (2)		Third period	Emerson Etem (5) - 6:54; Cole Grbavac (4) - 12:27
Corbin Boes (19 saves / 26 shots)		Goalie stats	Deven Dubyk (33 saves / 38 shots)

Medicine Hat wins series 4 – 2

==== (4) Kootenay Ice vs. (5) Moose Jaw Warriors ====
March 25	Kootenay Ice	0 – 4	Moose Jaw Warriors	Cranbrook Recreational Complex	Recap
No scoring		First period	Andrew Johnson (1) - 3:17; Quinton Howden (1) - 7:10; Quinton Howden (2) - sh - 8:01
No scoring		Second period	Jesse Paradis (1) - 4:00
No scoring		Third period	No scoring
Nathan Lieuwen (18 saves / 22 shots); Brett Teskey (2 saves / 2 shots)		Goalie stats	Thomas Heemskerk (30 saves / 30 shots)

March 26	Kootenay Ice	5 – 2	Moose Jaw Warriors	Cranbrook Recreational Complex	Recap
6:07 - pp - Matt Fraser (1); 15:02 - pp - Brayden McNabb (1)		First period	No scoring
0:56 - sh - Max Reinhart (1)		Second period	No scoring
19:03 - en - Joe Antilla (1); 19:59 - sh - en - Brock Montgomery (1)		Third period	Quinton Howden (3) - 2:16; Spencer Edwards (1) - 10:24
Nathan Lieuwen (18 saves / 20 shots)		Goalie stats	Thomas Heemskerk (37 saves / 40 shots)

March 29	Moose Jaw Warriors	4 – 0	Kootenay Ice	Moose Jaw Civic Centre	Recap
12:15 - pp - Spencer Edwards (2); 19:29 - Joe Kornelsen (1)		First period	No scoring
10:37 - pp - Antonín Honejsek (1)		Second period	No scoring
19:00 - Dylan Hood (1)		Third period	No scoring
Thomas Heemskerk (28 saves / 28 shots)		Goalie stats	Nathan Lieuwen (18 saves / 22 shots)

March 30	Moose Jaw Warriors	0 – 5	Kootenay Ice	Moose Jaw Civic Centre	Recap
No scoring		First period	Matt Fraser (2) - 11:16; Steele Boomer (1) - 18:11
No scoring		Second period	Joe Antilla (2) - sh - 1:42
No scoring		Third period	Joe Antilla (3) - 11:48; Cody Eakin (1) - 12:09
Thomas Heemskerk (32 saves / 37 shots)		Goalie stats	Nathan Lieuwen (25 saves / 25 shots)

April 1	Kootenay Ice	3 – 1	Moose Jaw Warriors	Cranbrook Recreational Complex	Recap
No scoring		First period	No scoring
18:31 - pp - Max Reinhart (2)		Second period	No scoring
14:04 - Cody Eakin (2); 19:24 - sh - en - Joe Antilla (4)		Third period	Quinton Howden (4) - 15:48
Nathan Lieuwen (27 saves / 28 shots)		Goalie stats	Thomas Heemskerk (46 saves / 48 shots)

April 3	Moose Jaw Warriors	4 – 5	Kootenay Ice	Moose Jaw Civic Centre	Recap
15:35 - Brett Lyon (1)		First period	Brayden McNabb (2) - 1:36; Max Reinhart (3) - 13:52; Matt Fraser (3) - 14:56
5:13 - pp - Quinton Howden (5); 14:00 - pp - Dylan Hood (2)		Second period	Matt Fraser (4) - 9:12
11:57 - Sam Fioretti (1)		Third period	Matt Fraser (5) - 9:22
Thomas Heemskerk (26 saves / 31 shots)		Goalie stats	Nathan Lieuwen (20 saves / 24 shots)

Kootenay wins series 4 – 2

=== Western Conference ===
==== (1) Portland Winterhawks vs. (8) Everett Silvertips ====
March 26	Portland Winterhawks	4 – 0	Everett Silvertips	Rose Garden	Recap
4:46 - pp - Riley Boychuk (1); 7:26 - Brendan Leipsic (1); 8:07 - sh - Ryan Johansen (1)		First period	No scoring
No scoring		Second period	No scoring
12:28 - Brad Ross (1)		Third period	No scoring
Mac Carruth (32 saves / 32 shots)		Goalie stats	Luke Siemens (41 saves / 45 shots)

March 27	Portland Winterhawks	7 – 2	Everett Silvertips	Rose Garden	Recap
0:38 - Nino Niederreiter (1); 8:34 - Craig Cunningham (1)		First period	No scoring
15:42 - Nino Niederreiter (2); 19:35 - pp - Brad Ross (2)		Second period	Markus McCrea (1) - 12:20
4:25 - Craig Cunningham (2); 11:32 - pp - Derrick Pouliot (1); 12:10 - Troy Rutkowski (1)		Third period	Tyler Maxwell (1) - pp - 12:55
Mac Carruth (37 saves / 39 shots)		Goalie stats	Luke Siemens (39 saves / 46 shots)

March 30	Everett Silvertips	4 – 5	Portland Winterhawks	Comcast Arena	Recap
14:41 - Ryan Murray (1); 19:18 - pp - Tyler Maxwell (2)		First period	Sven Bärtschi (1) - 4:21; Brad Ross - pp - 15:08
9:40 - pp - Rasmus Rissanen (1)		Second period	Nino Niederreiter (3) - 17:14; Ty Rattie (1) - 17:27
18:29 - pp - Rasmus Rissanen (2)		Third period	Ryan Johansen (2) - 14:00
Luke Siemens (45 saves / 50 shots)		Goalie stats	Mac Carruth (34 saves / 38 shots)

March 31	Everett Silvertips	2 – 6	Portland Winterhawks	Comcast Arena	Recap
5:22 - Jari Erricson (1)		First period	Riley Boychuk (2) - 16:28; Riley Boychuk (3) - pp - 18:51
10:08 - Manraj Hayer (1)		Second period	Craig Cunningham (3) - 0:45; Sven Bärtschi (2) - 4:10; Nino Niederreiter (4) - 4:39; Brad Ross (4) - 16:57
No scoring		Third period	No scoring
Luke Siemens (38 saves / 44 shots)		Goalie stats	Mac Carruth (31 saves / 33 shots)

Portland wins series 4 – 0

==== (2) Kelowna Rockets vs. (7) Prince George Cougars ====
March 25	Kelowna Rockets	4 – 1	Prince George Cougars	Prospera Place	Recap
18:52 - pp - Mitch Callahan (1)		First period	No scoring
No scoring		Second period	Charles Inglis (1) - 18:01
7:24 - pp - Geordie Wudrick (1); 13:52 - Damon Severson (1); 18:19 - en - Mitch Callahan (2)		Third period	No scoring
Adam Brown (24 saves / 25 shots)		Goalie stats	Ty Rimmer (26 saves / 29 shots)

March 26	Kelowna Rockets	7 – 4	Prince George Cougars	Prospera Place	Recap
No scoring		First period	James Dobrowolski (1) - pp - 11:27
1:03 - pp - Zak Stebner (1); 1:48 - Colton Sissons (1); 16:20 - Tyson Barrie (1)		Second period	Wilson Dumais (1) - 7:52; Sena Acolatse (1) - 9:24; Jaroslav Vlach (1) - 15:24
7:04 - pp - Cody Chikie (1); 9:55 - Jessey Astles (1); 18:32 - Kevin Smith (1); 19:07 - en - Geordie Wudrick (2)		Third period	No scoring
Adam Brown (26 saves / 30 shots)		Goalie stats	Ty Rimmer (25 saves / 31 shots)

March 29	Prince George Cougars	6 – 7	Kelowna Rockets	CN Centre	Recap
8:27 - Spencer Asuchak (1); 13:58 - Charles Inglis (2)		First period	Colton Heffley (1) - 2:16; Zach Franko (1) - 10:46; Spencer Main (1) - 17:45
6:41 - pp - Taylor Stefishen (1); 13:43 - Sena Acolatse (2); 16:59 - pp - Taylor Stefishen (2)		Second period	Mitch Callahan (3) - 18:45
19:23 - Martin Marinčin (1)		Third period	Brett Bulmer (1) - 0:13; Shane McColgan (1) - 12:07; Mitch Callahan (4) - 14:16
Ty Rimmer (22 saves / 29 shots)		Goalie stats	Adam Brown (35 saves / 41 shots)

March 30	Prince George Cougars	2 – 4	Kelowna Rockets	CN Centre	Recap
No scoring		First period	Zak Stebner (2) - pp - 11:00
9:59 - pp - Sena Acolatse (3)		Second period	Damon Severson (2) - 3:27
8:15 - Alex Forsberg (1)		Third period	Shane McColgan (2) - 4:14; Shane McColgan (3) - 10:31
Ty Rimmer (27 saves / 31 shots)		Goalie stats	Adam Brown (33 saves / 35 shots)

Kelowna wins series 4 – 0

==== (3) Spokane Chiefs vs. (6) Chilliwack Bruins ====
March 25	Chilliwack Bruins	2 – 3	OT	Spokane Chiefs	Prospera Centre	Recap
No scoring		First period		No scoring
9:27 - Mike Forsyth (1); 10:04 - Jamie Crooks (1)		Second period		Darren Kramer (1) - pp - 7:11
No scoring		Third period		Tyler Johnson (1) - 3:45
No scoring		First overtime period		Darren Kramer (2) - 10:00
Lucas Gore (60 saves / 63 shots)		Goalie stats		James Reid (22 saves / 24 shots)

March 26	Chilliwack Bruins	0 – 5	Spokane Chiefs	Prospera Centre	Recap
No scoring		First period	No scoring
No scoring		Second period	Kenton Miller (1) - 2:32; Dominik Uher (1) - pp - 6:48; Blake Gal (1) - 15:22
No scoring		Third period	Steven Kuhn (1) - 8:27; Darren Kramer (3) - pp - 18:44
Lucas Gore (42 saves / 47 shots)		Goalie stats	James Reid (26 saves / 26 shots)

March 30	Spokane Chiefs	3 – 4	OT	Chilliwack Bruins	Spokane Veterans Memorial Arena	Recap
8:33 - Anthony Bardaro (1); 11:06 - Tyler Johnson (2)		First period		No scoring
15:19 - Cole Hamblin (1)		Second period		No scoring
No scoring		Third period		Ryan Howse (1) - 3:04; Robin Soudek (1) - pp - 9:22; Kevin Sundher (1) - 11:44
No scoring		First overtime period		Kevin Sundher (2) - 3:20
James Reid (21 saves / 25 shots)		Goalie stats		Lucas Gore (54 saves / 57 shots)

March 31	Spokane Chiefs	4 – 2	Chilliwack Bruins	Spokane Veterans Memorial Arena	Recap
2:40 - Marek Kalus (1); 5:13 - Brenden Kichton (1); 17:52 - Mike Aviani (1)		First period	No scoring
No scoring		Second period	Brandon Manning (1) - 10:05
19:11 - en - Steven Kuhn (2)		Third period	Roman Horák (1) - 3:06
James Reid (19 saves / 21 shots)		Goalie stats	Lucas Gore (35 saves / 38 shots)

April 2	Spokane Chiefs	6 – 4	Chilliwack Bruins	Spokane Veterans Memorial Arena	Recap
Mitch Holmberg (1) - 4:58; Blake Gal (2) - 13:37; Blake Gal (3) - 19:12		First period	11:45 - pp - Kevin Sundher (3)
Mitch Holmberg (2) - 6:55		Second period	0:17 - Dylen McKinlay (1); 6:28 - pp - Robin Soudek (2)
Blake Gal (4) - 13:05; Levko Koper (1) - en - 19:41		Third period	11:14 - Dylen McKinlay (2)
James Reid (21 saves / 25 shots)		Goalie stats	Lucas Gore (37 saves / 42 shots)

Spokane wins series 4 – 1

==== (4) Tri-City Americans vs. (5) Vancouver Giants ====
March 25	Tri-City Americans	2 – 1	OT	Vancouver Giants	Toyota Center	Recap
No scoring		First period		Brendan Rowinski (1) - pp - 17:39
No scoring		Second period		No scoring
7:55 - David Conrad (1)		Third period		No scoring
19:57 - pp - Carter Ashton (1)		First overtime period		No scoring
Drew Owsley (25 saves / 26 shots)		Goalie stats		Mark Segal (44 saves / 46 shots)

March 26	Tri-City Americans	5 – 4	Vancouver Giants	Toyota Center	Recap
2:56 - Brendan Shinnimin (1); 9:17 - Patrick Holland (1); 14:09 - sh - Justin Feser (1)		First period	Brendan Gallagher (1) - 0:24; Michael Burns (1) - pp - 18:57
6:30 - Neal Prokop (1); 9:47 - pp - Matt MacKenzie (1)		Second period	Nathan Burns (1) - 1:52; Jordan Martinook (1) - pp - 16:24
No scoring		Third period	No scoring
Drew Owsley (28 saves / 32 shots)		Goalie stats	Mark Segal (28 saves / 33 shots)

March 29	Vancouver Giants	0 – 4	Tri-City Americans	Pacific Coliseum	Recap
No scoring		First period	No scoring
No scoring		Second period	Adam Hughesman (1) - pp - 17:57
No scoring		Third period	Connor Rankin (1) - 2:10; Adam Hughesman (2) - pp - 8:49; Justin Feser (2) - pp - 18:13
Mark Segal (20 saves / 24 shots)		Goalie stats	Drew Owsley (22 saves / 22 shots)

March 30	Vancouver Giants	1 – 5	Tri-City Americans	Pacific Coliseum	Recap
9:00 - Brendan Gallagher (2)		First period	Jordan Messier (1) - 2:11; Carter Ashton (2) - pp - 18:01
No scoring		Second period	No scoring
No scoring		Third period	Justin Feser (3) - 6:09; Mason Wilgosh (1) - 6:30; Mason Wilgosh (2) - 19:09
Mark Segal (20 saves / 24 shots); Brendan Jensen (3 saves / 4 shots)		Goalie stats	Drew Owsley (17 saves / 18 shots)

Tri-City wins series 4 – 0

== Conference Semi-finals ==
=== Eastern Conference ===
==== (1) Saskatoon Blades vs. (4) Kootenay Ice ====
April 8	Saskatoon Blades	1 – 4	Kootenay Ice	Credit Union Centre	Recap
13:58 - Stefan Elliott (3)		First period	Matt Fraser (6) - pp - 1:14
No scoring		Second period	Steele Boomer (2) - pp - 11:57; Max Reinhart (4) - 18:33
No scoring		Third period	Matt Fraser (7) - en - 19:48
Steven Stanford (29 saves / 32 shots)		Goalie stats	Nathan Lieuwen (35 saves / 36 shots)

April 9	Saskatoon Blades	2 – 3	OT	Kootenay Ice	Credit Union Centre	Recap
No scoring		First period		Max Reinhart (5) - 16:23
7:24 - Brent Benson (3)		Second period		No scoring
18:55 - Brayden Schenn (6)		Third period		Matt Fraser (8) - 4:12
No scoring		First overtime period		Joe Antilla (5) - 18:32
Steven Stanford (41 saves / 44 shots)		Goalie stats		Nathan Lieuwen (50 saves / 52 shots)

April 12	Kootenay Ice	3 – 0	Saskatoon Blades	Cranbrook Recreational Complex	Recap
18:34 - pp - Jesse Ismond (1)		First period	No scoring
1:58 - Brayden McNabb (3)		Second period	No scoring
12:18 - Joe Antilla (6)		Third period	No scoring
Nathan Lieuwen (22 saves / 22 shots)		Goalie stats	Steven Stanford (33 saves / 36 shots)

April 13	Kootenay Ice	5 – 2	Saskatoon Blades	Cranbrook Recreational Complex	Recap
No scoring		First period	Josh Nicholls (4) - 16:00
1:01 - pp - Max Reinhart (6); 7:43 - Matt Fraser (9)		Second period	No scoring
1:06 - Max Reinhart (7); 8:15 - Matt Fraser (10); 18:37 - sh - en - Cody Eakin (3)		Third period	Darian Dziurzynski (3) - 18:15
Nathan Lieuwen (33 saves / 35 shots)		Goalie stats	Steven Stanford (38 saves / 42 shots)

Kootenay wins series 4 – 0

==== (2) Red Deer Rebels vs. (3) Medicine Hat Tigers ====
April 8	Red Deer Rebels	1 – 9	Medicine Hat Tigers	Enmax Centrium	Recap
No scoring		First period	Boston Leier (2) - 3:23; Thomas Carr (1) - pp - 8:56; Emerson Etem (6) - pp - 9:06
0:17 - John Persson (1)		Second period	Kale Kessy (3) - 3:50; Jace Coyle (3) - pp - 5:14; Linden Vey (6) - pp - 6:04; Linden Vey (7) - pp - 7:00; Wacey Hamilton (3) - sh - 12:28; Cole Grbavac (5) - pp - 16:29
No scoring		Third period	No scoring
Darcy Kuemper (12 saves / 17 shots); Dawson Guhle (4 saves / 8 shots)		Goalie stats	Tyler Bunz (36 saves / 37 shots)

April 9	Red Deer Rebels	0 – 5	Medicine Hat Tigers	Enmax Centrium	Recap
No scoring		First period	Hunter Shinkaruk (3) - 16:13
No scoring		Second period	Cole Grbavac (6) - pp - 8:48; Linden Vey (8) - 14:57; Linden Vey (9) - pp - 19:01
No scoring		Third period	Cole Grbavac (7) - 1:02
Darcy Kuemper (16 saves / 21 shots)		Goalie stats	Tyler Bunz (33 saves / 33 shots)

April 12	Medicine Hat Tigers	3 – 1	Red Deer Rebels	Medicine Hat Arena	Recap
No scoring		First period	No scoring
14:27 - Kellan Tochkin (3)		Second period	Justin Weller (2) - 3:13
6:09 - Hunter Shinkaruk (4); 16:34 - Cole Grbavac (8)		Third period	No scoring
Tyler Bunz (26 saves / 27 shots)		Goalie stats	Darcy Kuemper (26 saves / 29 shots)

April 13	Medicine Hat Tigers	0 – 1	Red Deer Rebels	Medicine Hat Arena	Recap
No scoring		First period	No scoring
No scoring		Second period	No scoring
No scoring		Third period	Byron Froese (4) - 11:27
Tyler Bunz (23 saves / 24 shots)		Goalie stats	Dawson Guhle (19 saves / 19 shots)

April 16	Red Deer Rebels	4 – 5	OT	Medicine Hat Tigers	Enmax Centrium	Recap
19:01 - pp - Matt Dumba (2)		First period		Cole Grbavac (9) - 13:59
6:13 - Byron Froese (5); 16:18 - pp - Brett Ferguson (4)		Second period		No scoring
2:21 - pp - John Persson (2)		Third period		Boston Leier (3) - 2:44; Linden Vey (10) - 9:41; Emerson Etem (7) - 15:46
No scoring		First overtime period		Kellan Tochkin (4) - 9:32
Dawson Guhle (28 saves / 33 shots)		Goalie stats		Tyler Bunz (41 saves / 45 shots)

Medicine Hat wins series 4 – 1

=== Western Conference ===
==== (1) Portland Winterhawks vs. (2) Kelowna Rockets ====
April 7	Portland Winterhawks	1 – 5	Kelowna Rockets	Rose Garden	Recap
7:08 - pp - Troy Rutkowski (2)		First period	Zak Stebner (3) - pp - 3:18; Shane McColgan (4) - 15:45
No scoring		Second period	Shane McColgan (5) - 19:48
No scoring		Third period	Shane McColgan (6) - 2:04; Evan Bloodoff (1) - 12:03
Mac Carruth (31 saves / 36 shots)		Goalie stats	Adam Brown (45 saves / 46 shots)

April 10	Portland Winterhawks	6 – 3	Kelowna Rockets	Rose Garden	Recap
No scoring		First period	Shane McColgan (7) - 6:55
6:55 - Ty Rattie (2); 9:21 - Craig Cunningham (4); 15:29 - Ryan Johansen (3); 19:52 - Ryan Johansen (4)		Second period	Jessey Astles (2) - 11:13
4:26 - Joesph Morrow (1); 18:23 - pp - Ryan Johansen (5)		Third period	Colton Sissons (2) - pp - 7:08
Mac Carruth (25 saves / 28 shots)		Goalie stats	Adam Brown (46 saves / 52 shots)

April 12	Kelowna Rockets	4 – 5	Portland Winterhawks	Prospera Place	Recap
14:00 - pp - Geordie Wudrick (3); 15:53 - sh - Tyson Barrie (2)		First period	Joesph Morrow (2) - pp - 7:34
17:38 - Brett Bulmer (2)		Second period	Nino Niederreiter (5) - 4:07; Nino Niederreiter (6) - pp - 13:42; Tyler Wotherspoon (1) - 18:18
17:45 - Colton Sissons (3)		Third period	Riley Boychuk (4) - pp - 9:50
Adam Brown (32 saves / 37 shots)		Goalie stats	Mac Carruth (38 saves / 42 shots)

April 13	Kelowna Rockets	2 – 4	Portland Winterhawks	Prospera Place	Recap
17:39 - pp - Shane McColgan (8)		First period	Ty Rattie (3) - 12:25; Taylor Peters (1) - 13:04
No scoring		Second period	No scoring
12:46 - Brett Bulmer (3)		Third period	Joesph Morrow (3) - pp - 2:30; Ryan Johansen (6) - 16:11
Adam Brown (35 saves / 39 shots)		Goalie stats	Mac Carruth (24 saves / 26 shots)

April 15	Portland Winterhawks	1 – 2	OT	Kelowna Rockets	Rose Garden	Recap
No scoring		First period		No scoring
15:09 - pp - Nino Niederreiter (7)		Second period		Mitch Callahan (5) - pp - 4:38
No scoring		Third period		No scoring
No scoring		First overtime period		Jessey Astles (3) - 7:08
Mac Carruth (36 saves / 38 shots)		Goalie stats		Adam Brown (54 saves / 55 shots)

April 17	Kelowna Rockets	2 – 4	Portland Winterhawks	Prospera Place	Recap
No scoring		First period	Ty Rattie (4) - 6:44; Sven Bärtschi (3) - 7:35
13:03 - Geordie Wudrick (4)		Second period	Craig Cunningham (5) - 3:14
0:54 - pp - Brett Bulmer (4)		Third period	Joesph Morrow (4) - en - 19:57
Adam Brown (35 saves / 38 shots)		Goalie stats	Mac Carruth (45 saves / 47 shots)

Portland wins series 4 – 2

==== (3) Spokane Chiefs vs. (4) Tri-City Americans ====
April 9	Spokane Chiefs	1 – 3	Tri-City Americans	Spokane Veterans Memorial Arena	Recap
16:23 - Steven Kuhn (3)		First period	Kruise Reddick (1) - 3:41; Brendan Shinnimin (2) - 14:03
No scoring		Second period	No scoring
No scoring		Third period	Jordan Messier (2) - 9:38
James Reid (15 saves / 18 shots)		Goalie stats	Drew Owsley (34 saves / 35 shots)

April 10	Spokane Chiefs	6 – 3	Tri-City Americans	Spokane Veterans Memorial Arena	Recap
5:52 - Mitch Holmberg (3); 19:00 - pp - Mitch Holmberg (4)		First period	Jordan Messier (3) - 15:16
8:48 - Matt Marantz (1); 9:13 - pp - Levko Koper (2); 14:52 - Steven Kuhn (4)		Second period	No scoring
10:35 - pp - Tyler Johnson (3)		Third period	Justin Feser (4) - 3:40; Brendan Shinnimin (3) - pp - 19:43
James Reid (12 saves / 15 shots)		Goalie stats	Drew Owsley (21 saves / 26 shots); Eric Comrie (13 saves / 14 shots)

April 12	Tri-City Americans	1 – 4	Spokane Chiefs	Toyota Center	Recap
No scoring		First period	Dominik Uher (2) - 1:37
12:08 - Neal Prokop (2)		Second period	Blake Gal (5) - pp - 8:50; Kenton Miller (2) - 11:35
No scoring		Third period	Darren Kramer (4) - 17:14
Drew Owsley (37 saves / 41 shots)		Goalie stats	James Reid (20 saves / 21 shots)

April 14	Tri-City Americans	4 – 3	2OT	Spokane Chiefs	Toyota Center	Recap
No scoring		First period		Steven Kuhn (5) - pp - 16:33
5:49 - pp - Patrick Holland (2); 10:58 - Kruise Reddick (2); 16:32 - Brendan Shinnimin (4)		Second period		Tyler Johnson (4) - sh - 5:16
No scoring		Third period		Tyler Johnson (5) - pp - 12:17
2:32 - Tyler Schmidt (1)		Second overtime period		No scoring
Drew Owsley (47 saves / 50 shots)		Goalie stats		James Reid (47 saves / 51 shots)

April 17	Tri-City Americans	2 – 3	OT	Spokane Chiefs	Toyota Center	Recap
No scoring		First period		0:27 - Jared Cowen (1)
No scoring		Second period		4:32 - Matt Marantz (2)
Tyler Schmidt (2) - 3:24; Carter Ashton (3) - 18:59		Third period		No scoring
No scoring		First overtime period		4:52 - Blake Gal (6)
Drew Owsley (40 saves / 43 shots)		Goalie stats		James Reid (33 saves / 35 shots)

April 19	Spokane Chiefs	5 – 4	OT	Tri-City Americans	Spokane Veterans Memorial Arena	Recap
No scoring		First period		6:03 - Adam Hughesman (3)
No scoring		Second period		2:42 - pp - Patrick Holland; 8:54 - Patrick Holland (4)
Darren Kramer (5) - 1:16; Tanner Mort (1) - 2:35; Blake Gal (7) - 3:13; Kenton Miller (3) - 8:57		Third period		No scoring
Levko Koper (3) - 6:39		First overtime period		12:39 - pp - Adam Hughesman (4)
James Reid (26 saves / 30 shots)		Goalie stats		Drew Owsley (33 saves / 38 shots)

Spokane wins series 4 – 2

== Conference Finals ==
=== Eastern Conference ===
==== (3) Medicine Hat Tigers vs. (4) Kootenay Ice ====
April 22	Medicine Hat Tigers	5 – 6	OT	Kootenay Ice	Medicine Hat Arena	Recap
14:04 - Linden Vey (11)		First period		Drew Czerwonka (1) - 1:45; Max Reinhart (8) - 11:01; Erik Benoit (1) - 14:21
11:22 - pp - Emerson Etem (8); 15:23 - Linden Vey (12)		Second period		No scoring
4:03 - Emerson Etem (9); 10:03 - pp - Wacey Hamilton (4)		Third period		Matt Fraser (11) - 7:12; Matt Fraser (12) - pp - 18:05
No scoring		First overtime period		Cody Eakin (4) - 5:59
Tyler Bunz (31 saves / 37 shots)		Goalie stats		Nathan Lieuwen (30 saves / 35 shots)

April 23	Medicine Hat Tigers	0 – 3	Kootenay Ice	Medicine Hat Arena	Recap
No scoring		First period	Cody Eakin (5) - 3:57
No scoring		Second period	Kevin King (1) - 14:32
No scoring		Third period	Joe Antilla (7) - en - 18:41
Tyler Bunz (37 saves / 39 shots)		Goalie stats	Nathan Lieuwen (25 saves / 25 shots)

April 26	Kootenay Ice	3 – 1	Medicine Hat Tigers	Cranbrook Recreational Complex	Recap
6:33 - pp - Max Reinhart (9)		First period	No scoring
14:08 - Cody Eakin (6)		Second period	Emerson Etem (10) - pp - 1:13
3:35 - Jesse Ismond (2)		Third period	No scoring
Nathan Lieuwen (22 saves / 23 shots)		Goalie stats	Tyler Bunz (32 saves / 35 shots)

April 27	Kootenay Ice	7 – 2	Medicine Hat Tigers	Cranbrook Recreational Complex	Recap
Max Reinhart (10) - 6:20; Max Reinhart (11) - 11:18; Max Reinhart (12) - 13:02; Cody Eakin (7) - 18:54		First period	14:17 - Kellan Tochkin (5)
Cody Eakin (8) - 6:40; Max Reinhart (13) - sh - 9:15		Second period	4:42 - Cole Grbavac (10)
Max Reinhart (14) - sh - 4:50		Third period	No scoring
Nathan Lieuwen (21 saves / 23 shots)		Goalie stats	Tyler Bunz (10 saves / 15 shots); Devan Dubyk (18 saves / 20 shots)

Kootenay wins series 4 – 0

=== Western Conference ===
==== (1) Portland Winterhawks vs. (3) Spokane Chiefs ====
April 22	Portland Winterhawks	1 – 2	Spokane Chiefs	Rose Garden	Recap
No scoring		First period	Brady Brassart (1) - 2:11
No scoring		Second period	Levko Koper (4) - pp - 4:25
19:36 - Ryan Johansen (7)		Third period	No scoring
Mac Carruth (41 saves / 43 shots)		Goalie stats	James Reid (27 saves / 28 shots)

April 24	Portland Winterhawks	2 – 1	Spokane Chiefs	Rose Garden	Recap
18:22 - William Wrenn (1)		First period	Matt Marantz (3) - 17:49
7:38 - pp - Ryan Johansen (8)		Second period	No scoring
No scoring		Third period	No scoring
Mac Carruth (34 saves / 35 shots)		Goalie stats	James Reid (34 saves / 36 shots)

April 27	Spokane Chiefs	2 – 3	OT	Portland Winterhawks	Spokane Veterans Memorial Arena	Recap
15:07 - Jared Cowen (2)		First period		Taylor Peters (2) - sh - 16:13
No scoring		Second period		No scoring
8:40 - Levko Koper (5)		Third period		Ryan Johansen (9) - 17:46
No scoring		First overtime period		Brendan Leipsic (2) - 7:44
James Reid (29 saves / 32 shots)		Goalie stats		Mac Carruth (41 saves / 43 shots)

April 29	Spokane Chiefs	8 – 3	Portland Winterhawks	Spokane Veterans Memorial Arena	Recap
0:10 - Matt Marantz (4); 12:41 - Tyler Johnson (6)		First period	Joseph Morrow (5) - pp - 10:54
3:15 - Collin Valcourt (1); 14:20 - Anthony Bardaro (2); 18:52 - Levko Koper (6)		Second period	Tyler Wotherspoon (2) - sh - 10:54
3:43 - Levko Koper (7); 6:47 - pp - Levko Koper (8); 16:27 - Mitch Holmberg (5)		Third period	Ryan Johansen (10) - pp - 18:18
James Reid (22 saves / 24 shots); Mac Engel (7 saves / 8 shots)		Goalie stats	Mac Carruth (22 saves / 28 shots); Keith Hamilton (11 saves / 13 shots)

April 30	Portland Winterhawks	3 – 2	Spokane Chiefs	Rose Garden	Recap
No scoring		First period	Tyler Johnson (7) - 0:59
19:27 - Sven Bärtschi (4)		Second period	No scoring
5:22 - Ty Rattie (5); 11:47 - Craig Cunningham (6)		Third period	Mitch Holmberg (6) - 12:37
Mac Carruth (39 saves / 41 shots)		Goalie stats	James Reid (40 saves / 43 shots)

May 2	Spokane Chiefs	3 – 6	Portland Winterhawks	Spokane Veterans Memorial Arena	Recap
2:32 - Marek Kalus (2); 3:32 - Mike Aviani (2)		First period	Sven Bärtschi (5) - 8:17
19:44 - Levko Koper (9)		Second period	Ryan Johansen (11) - 9:38; Craig Cunningham (7) - 10:38
No scoring		Third period	Troy Rutkowski (3) - 5:22; Ty Rattie (6) - 14:07; Nino Niederreiter (8) - 17:41
James Reid (32 saves / 38 shots)		Goalie stats	Mac Carruth (24 saves / 27 shots)

Portland wins series 4 – 2

== WHL Championship ==
=== (E4) Kootenay Ice vs. Portland Winterhawks (W1) ===
May 6	Portland Winterhawks	4 – 3	OT	Kootenay Ice	Rose Garden	Recap
2:06 - Sven Bärtschi (6); 12:51 - Sven Bärtschi (7); 19:57 - Nino Niederreiter (9)		First period		Hayden Rintoul (1) - 6:31; Joe Antilla (8) - 17:50
No scoring		Second period		No scoring
No scoring		Third period		Kevin King (2) - 11:11
0:55 - pp - Ty Rattie (7)		First overtime period		No scoring
Mac Carruth (39 saves / 42 shots)		Goalie stats		Nathan Lieuwen (30 saves / 34 shots)

May 7	Portland Winterhawks	5 – 7	Kootenay Ice	Rose Garden	Recap
9:40 - Brendan Leipsic (3)		First period	Matt Fraser (13) - 5:14
19:19 - sh - Sven Bärtschi (8)		Second period	Matt Fraser (14) - 6:54; Max Reinhart (15) - pp - 8:54; Cody Eakin (9) - pp - 10:15; Steele Boomer (3) - pp - 13:04; Kevin King (3) - pp - 14:32
6:12 - pp - Sven Bärtschi (9); 8:01 - Taylor Peters (3); 8:14 - Joesph Morrow (6)		Third period	Kevin King (4) - en - 19:50
Mac Carruth (23 saves / 29 shots); Keith Hamilton (13 saves / 13 shots)		Goalie stats	Nathan Lieuwen (39 saves / 44 shots)

May 10	Kootenay Ice	3 – 2	OT	Portland Winterhawks	Cranbrook Recreational Complex	Recap
17:53 - Kevin King (5)		First period		Ty Rattie (8) - 18:54
No scoring		Second period		No scoring
13:58 - Drew Czerwonka (2)		Third period		Sven Bärtschi (10) - 3:54
6:12 - Joe Antilla (9)		First overtime period		No scoring
Nathan Lieuwen (34 saves / 36 shots)		Goalie stats		Mac Carruth (38 saves / 41 shots)

May 11	Kootenay Ice	5 – 4	OT	Portland Winterhawks	Cranbrook Recreational Complex	Recap
Jesse Ismond (3) - 0:19; Cody Eakin (10) - 7:46		First period		No scoring
Jesse Ismond (4) - 18:11		Second period		0:41 - Ryan Johansen (12); 14:19 - Troy Rutkowski (4)
Cody Eakin (11) - 12:30		Third period		16:25 - Ryan Johansen (13); 19:43 - Ty Rattie (9)
Matt Fraser (15) - pp - 13:08		First overtime period		No scoring
Nathan Lieuwen (31 saves / 35 shots)		Goalie stats		Mac Carruth (33 saves / 38 shots)

May 13	Portland Winterhawks	1 – 4	Kootenay Ice	Rose Garden	Recap
2:26 - Tyler Wotherspoon (3)		First period	Steele Boomer (4) - 15:47
No scoring		Second period	Matt Fraser (16) - pp - 19:16
No scoring		Third period	Matt Fraser (17) - 14:15; Jesse Ismond (5) - en - 19:19
Mac Carruth (36 saves / 39 shots)		Goalie stats	Nathan Lieuwen (26 saves / 27 shots)

Kootenay wins series 4 – 1

== Playoff scoring leaders ==
Note: GP = Games played; G = Goals; A = Assists; Pts = Points; PIM = Penalty minutes

Player	Team	GP	G	A	Pts	PIM
Ryan Johansen	Portland Winterhawks	21	13	15	28	6
Matt Fraser	Kootenay Ice	19	17	10	27	18
Max Reinhart	Kootenay Ice	19	15	12	27	12
Cody Eakin	Kootenay Ice	19	11	16	27	14
Sven Baertschi	Portland Winterhawks	21	10	17	27	16
Nino Niederreiter	Portland Winterhawks	21	9	18	27	30
Brayden McNabb	Kootenay Ice	19	3	24	27	37
Linden Vey	Medicine Hat Tigers	15	12	13	25	8
Ty Rattie	Portland Winterhawks	21	9	13	22	22
Emerson Etem	Medicine Hat Tigers	15	10	11	21	7

== Playoff leading goaltenders ==
Note: GP = Games played; Mins = Minutes played; W = Wins; L = Losses; GA = Goals Allowed; SO = Shutouts; SV& = Save percentage; GAA = Goals against average

Player	Team	GP	Mins	W	L	GA	SO	Sv%	GAA
Nathan Lieuwen	Kootenay Ice	19	1178	16	3	44	3	0.923	2.24
Thomas Heemskerk	Moose Jaw Warriors	6	357	2	4	15	2	0.930	2.52
Steven Stanford	Saskatoon Blades	10	619	4	6	26	1	0.930	2.52
Drew Owsley	Tri-City Americans	10	641	6	4	27	1	0.918	2.53
James Reid	Spokane Chiefs	17	1071	10	7	46	1	0.906	2.58

== WHL awards ==
Scotty Munro Memorial Trophy	Regular season champions	Saskatoon Blades	
Four Broncos Memorial Trophy	Player of the Year	Darcy Kuemper	Red Deer Rebels
Bob Clarke Trophy	Top Scorer	Linden Vey	Medicine Hat Tigers
Bill Hunter Trophy	Top Defenseman	Stefan Elliott	Saskatoon Blades
Jim Piggott Memorial Trophy	Rookie of the Year	Mathew Dumba	Red Deer Rebels
Del Wilson Trophy	Top Goaltender	Darcy Kuemper	Red Deer Rebels
WHL Plus-Minus Award	Top Plus-Minus Rating	Stefan Elliott	Saskatoon Blades
Brad Hornung Trophy	Most Sportsmanlike Player	Tyler Johnson	Spokane Chiefs
Daryl K. (Doc) Seaman Trophy	Scholastic Player of the Year	Colin Smith	Kamloops Blazers
Jim Donlevy Memorial Trophy	Scholastic team of the Year	Swift Current Broncos	
Dunc McCallum Memorial Trophy	Coach of the Year	Don Nachbaur	Spokane Chiefs
Lloyd Saunders Memorial Trophy	Executive of the Year	Lorne Molleken	Saskatoon Blades
Allen Paradice Memorial Trophy	Top Official	Matt Kirk	
St. Clair Group Trophy	Marketing/Public Relations Award	Mike Moore	Calgary Hitmen
Doug Wickenheiser Memorial Trophy	Humanitarian of the Year	Spencer Edwards	Moose Jaw Warriors
WHL Playoff MVP	WHL Finals Most Valuable Player	Nathan Lieuwen	Kootenay Ice
Professional Hockey Achievement; Academic Recipient	Alumni Achievement Awards	Bobby Clarke; Jeff Zorn	

=== All-Star teams ===
==== Eastern Conference ====
First Team		Pos.	Second Team	
Player	Team	Pos.	Player	Team
Darcy Kuemper	Red Deer Rebels	G	Tyler Bunz	Medicine Hat Tigers
Stefan Elliott	Saskatoon Blades	D	Alex Petrovic	Red Deer Rebels
Brayden McNabb	Kootenay Ice	D	Duncan Siemens	Saskatoon Blades
Linden Vey	Medicine Hat Tigers	F	Cody Eakin	Kootenay Ice
Ryan Nugent-Hopkins	Red Deer Rebels	F	Brayden Schenn	Saskatoon Blades
Mark Stone	Brandon Wheat Kings	F	Quinton Howden	Moose Jaw Warriors

==== Western Conference ====
First Team		Pos.	Second Team	
Player	Team	Pos.	Player	Team
James Reid	Spokane Chiefs	G	Calvin Pickard	Seattle Thunderbirds
Tyson Barrie	Kelowna Rockets	D	Brenden Kichton	Spokane Chiefs
Jared Cowen	Spokane Chiefs	D	Ryan Murray	Everett Silvertips
Brendan Gallagher	Vancouver Giants	F	Brendan Shinnimin	Tri-City Americans
Tyler Johnson	Spokane Chiefs	F	Brendan Ranford	Kamloops Blazers
Ryan Johansen	Portland Winterhawks	F	Ryan Howse	Chilliwack Bruins

== See also ==
- List of WHL seasons
- 2010–11 OHL season
- 2010–11 QMJHL season
- 2010 in ice hockey
- 2011 in ice hockey

Preceded by 2009–10 WHL season	WHL seasons	Succeeded by 2011–12 WHL season
