= Brett Bulmer =

Canadian ice hockey player (born 1992)

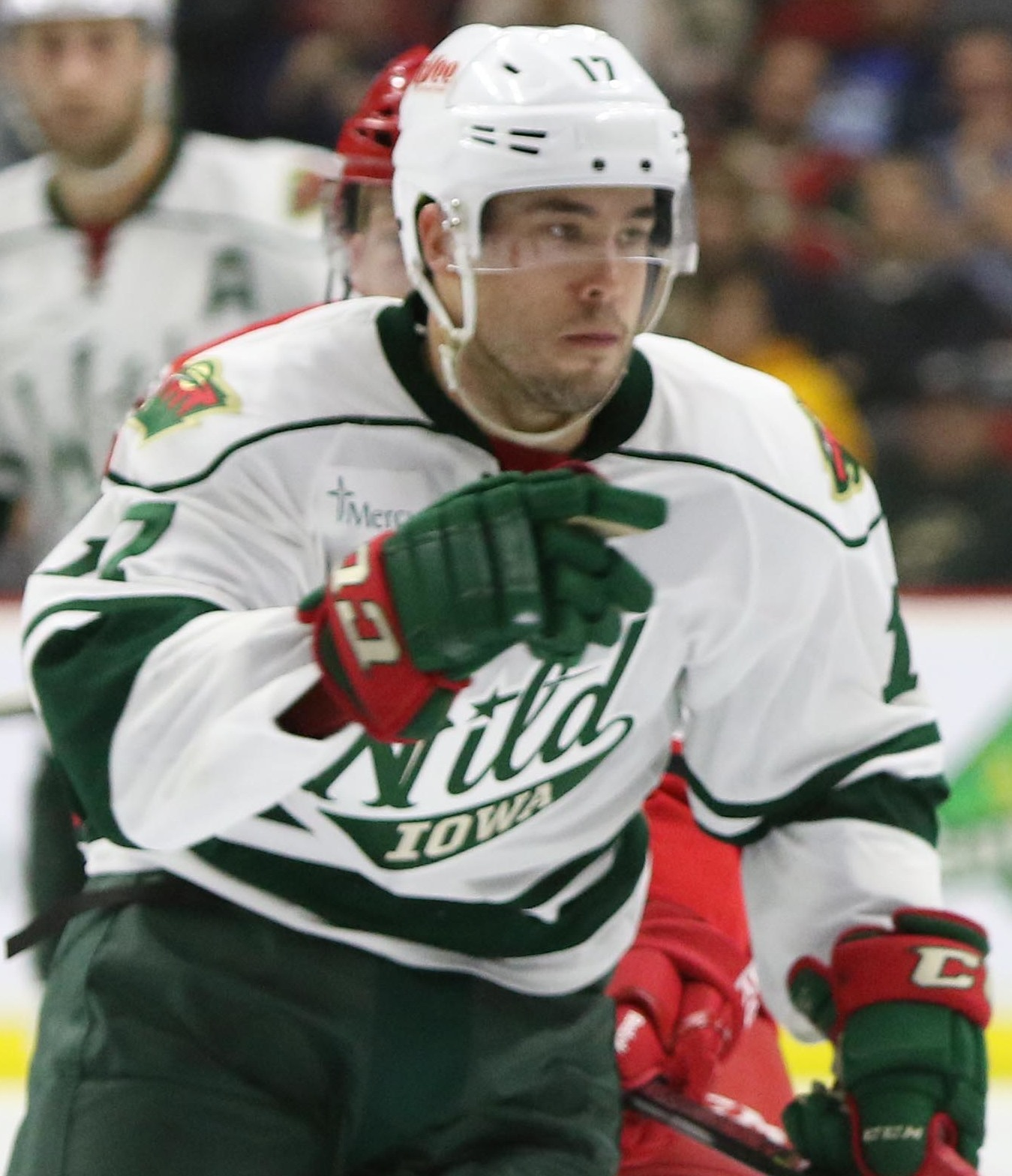
- Bulmer with the Iowa Wild in 2015
- Born: April 26, 1992 (age 34) Prince George, British Columbia, Canada
- Height: 6 ft 4 in (193 cm)
- Weight: 212 lb (96 kg; 15 st 2 lb)
- Position: Right wing
- Shoots: Right
- Oberliga team Former teams: Tilburg Trappers; Minnesota Wild; Ilves; ERC Ingolstadt; Florida Everblades; Fife Flyers; Nottingham Panthers; EHC Freiburg; Hannover Indians
- NHL draft: 39th overall, 2010; Minnesota Wild
- Playing career: 2011–present

Brett Bulmer (born April 26, 1992) is a Canadian professional ice hockey player. He is currently playing for Indy Fuel in the ECHL. Bulmer previously iced with the Nottingham Panthers and the Fife Flyers in the EIHL. He was selected by the Minnesota Wild in the second round (39th overall) of the 2010 NHL entry draft.

== Playing career ==
On April 21, 2011, Bulmer was signed by the Minnesota Wild to a three-year entry-level contract. Bulmer made his NHL debut on opening night of the 2011–12 season on October 8, 2011. After playing in nine NHL games, in which he registered three assists, six penalty minutes, and a plus-one rating, the 19-year-old was returned to his junior team the Kelowna Rockets of the Western Hockey League to continue his development on October 31, 2011. Bulmer missed a portion of the 2012–13 AHL season due to injuries.

On December 12, 2013, Bulmer was recalled to the Minnesota Wild, he played in 5 games going scoreless, before he was reassigned to Iowa on December 20, 2013.

As an un-signed free agent from the Wild over the summer, Bulmer opted to continue his career abroad, signing mid-season deal with Finnish club, Ilves Tampere of the top tier Liiga on October 30, 2016. On February 6, 2017, he transferred to ERC Ingolstadt of the German DEL, signing a contract for the remainder of the 2016–17 campaign. Bulmer appeared in the final 7 regular season games with Ingolstadt, contributing with 3 points before suffering a preliminary playoff loss to the Fischtown Pinguins to conclude his tenure with ERC.

On September 28, 2017, Bulmer opted to continue his career back in North America, signing a one-year ECHL contract with the Florida Everblades.

Ahead of the 2018–19 season, Bulmer penned a one-year deal with British EIHL side Fife Flyers. In August 2019, Bulmer moved to Fife's Elite League counterparts Nottingham Panthers.

In February 2020, an issue with Bulmer's visa forced Nottingham to release him from his contract - although the club did not rule out the player returning for next season. Bulmer then joined DEL2 side EHC Freiburg, a side led by former Glasgow Clan coach Pete Russell.

After a 76-point season with Oberliga side Hannover Indians in 2020–21, Bulmer opted to remain in the German third tier and signed for Tilburg Trappers for the 2021–22 season.

== Career statistics ==
			Regular season					Playoffs
Season	Team	League	GP	G	A	Pts	PIM	GP	G	A	Pts	PIM
2007–08	Cariboo Cougars	BCMML	40	20	19	39	40	6	2	7	9	4
2008–09	Cariboo Cougars	BCMML	36	28	35	63	56	5	4	2	6	8
2008–09	Kelowna Rockets	WHL	3	0	0	0	2	—	—	—	—	—
2009–10	Kelowna Rockets	WHL	65	13	27	40	95	12	3	2	5	6
2010–11	Kelowna Rockets	WHL	57	18	31	49	109	10	4	2	6	4
2010–11	Houston Aeros	AHL	—	—	—	—	—	8	0	0	0	6
2011–12	Minnesota Wild	NHL	9	0	3	3	6	—	—	—	—	—
2011–12	Kelowna Rockets	WHL	53	34	28	62	93	3	1	4	5	17
2011–12	Houston Aeros	AHL	6	1	1	2	2	4	1	1	2	2
2012–13	Houston Aeros	AHL	43	4	3	7	41	4	0	0	0	2
2013–14	Iowa Wild	AHL	43	11	8	19	79	—	—	—	—	—
2013–14	Minnesota Wild	NHL	5	0	0	0	2	—	—	—	—	—
2014–15	Iowa Wild	AHL	53	4	12	16	50	—	—	—	—	—
2015–16	Iowa Wild	AHL	58	3	8	11	73	—	—	—	—	—
2015–16	Minnesota Wild	NHL	3	0	0	0	7	—	—	—	—	—
2016–17	Ilves	Liiga	23	2	3	5	57	—	—	—	—	—
2016–17	ERC Ingolstadt	DEL	7	1	2	3	6	2	0	0	0	14
2017–18	Florida Everblades	ECHL	70	23	19	42	144	20	6	7	13	38
2018–19	Fife Flyers	EIHL	57	26	31	57	106	—	—	—	—	—
2019–20	Nottingham Panthers	EIHL	32	8	13	21	12	—	—	—	—	—
2019–20	EHC Freiburg	DEL2	4	2	4	6	2	—	—	—	—	—
2020–21	Hannover Indians	Germany3	39	37	39	76	40	—	—	—	—	—
2021–22	Tilburg Trappers	Germany3	44	36	53	89	75	—	—	—	—	—
2022–23	Tilburg Trappers	Germany3	29	17	24	41	41	—	—	—	—	—
2023–24	Indy Fuel	ECHL	33	12	20	32	31	3	0	0	0	5
NHL totals			17	0	3	3	15	—	—	—	—	—
