= Wacey Hamilton =

Canadian ice hockey player

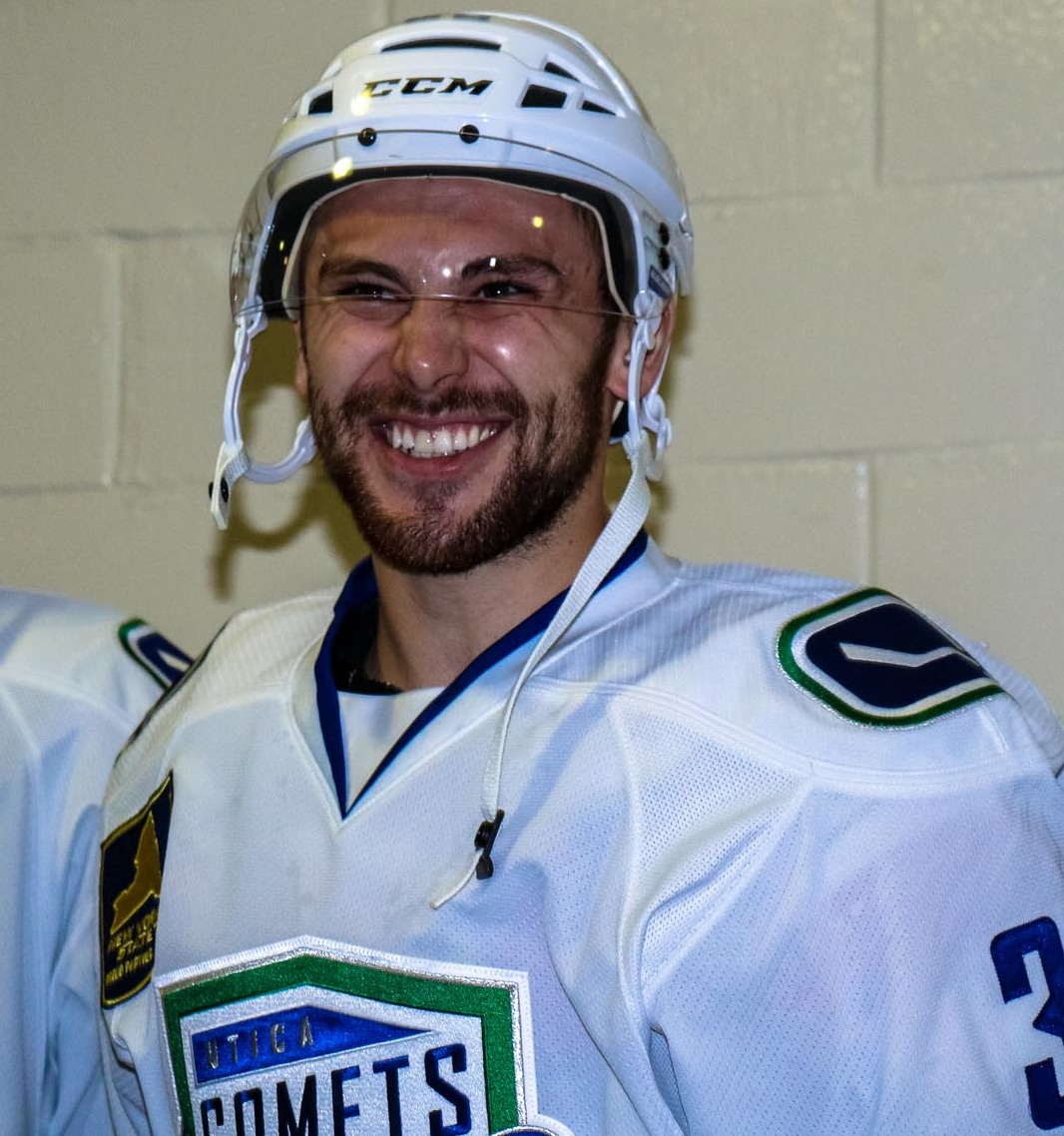
- Hamilton in 2015
- Born: September 10, 1990 (age 35) Cochrane, Alberta, Canada
- Height: 5 ft 10 in (178 cm)
- Weight: 165 lb (75 kg; 11 st 11 lb)
- Position: Centre
- Shot: Left
- Played for: Binghamton Senators; Utica Comets
- NHL draft: Undrafted
- Playing career: 2011–2020

Wacey Hamilton (born September 10, 1990) is a Canadian former professional ice hockey player. He most notably played for the Binghamton Senators and Utica Comets in the American Hockey League (AHL).

== Playing career ==
Hamilton played his junior ice hockey with the Medicine Hat Tigers of the Western Hockey League, ending his junior career in 2011. Undrafted, Hamilton attended the Colorado Avalanche 2010 training camp before returning for his final junior season. On March 8, 2011, the Ottawa Senators of the National Hockey League (NHL) signed Hamilton to a three-year entry-level contract.

He made his professional debut in the 2011–12 season, playing in 74 games for the Binghamton Senators of the American Hockey League (AHL) and two with the Elmira Jackals of the ECHL. In 2012–13, Hamilton missed the season's first 35 games with Binghamton, returning to the line-up to play 38 games with the Senators, recording four goals and four assists.

Following the 2013–14 season, the Senators did not tender a qualifying offer to Hamilton and as a result he became an unrestricted free agent on July 1, 2014. Unable to garner NHL interest, Hamilton accepted a try-out contract with the Utica Comets of the AHL, affiliate to the Vancouver Canucks, on September 29, 2014.

Following his sixth year with the Comets in the COVID-19 pandemic affected 2019–20 season, Hamilton remained a free agent into the delayed 2020–21 season. With health concerns and family considerations, Hamilton announced his retirement from hockey after 9 professional seasons on February 23, 2021.

== Career statistics ==
			Regular season					Playoffs
Season	Team	League	GP	G	A	Pts	PIM	GP	G	A	Pts	PIM
2006–07	Camrose Kodiaks	AJHL	49	11	6	17	38	—	—	—	—	—
2007–08	Medicine Hat Tigers	WHL	63	13	19	32	95	5	1	0	1	6
2008–09	Medicine Hat Tigers	WHL	37	4	13	17	64	11	1	3	4	24
2009–10	Medicine Hat Tigers	WHL	67	24	47	71	100	12	3	5	8	23
2010–11	Medicine Hat Tigers	WHL	67	20	53	73	113	15	4	8	12	20
2011–12	Binghamton Senators	AHL	74	5	6	11	46	—	—	—	—	—
2011–12	Elmira Jackals	ECHL	2	0	2	2	2	—	—	—	—	—
2012–13	Binghamton Senators	AHL	38	4	4	8	17	3	0	0	0	4
2013–14	Binghamton Senators	AHL	63	4	16	20	73	4	0	1	1	0
2014–15	Utica Comets	AHL	41	5	10	15	27	22	2	2	4	25
2015–16	Utica Comets	AHL	53	8	7	15	61	—	—	—	—	—
2016–17	Utica Comets	AHL	67	9	10	19	93	—	—	—	—	—
2017–18	Utica Comets	AHL	45	4	18	22	54	5	1	1	2	8
2018–19	Utica Comets	AHL	23	1	10	11	33	—	—	—	—	—
2019–20	Utica Comets	AHL	28	4	7	11	30	—	—	—	—	—
AHL totals			432	44	88	132	434	34	3	4	7	37
