= Sebastian Owuya =

Swedish ice hockey player (born 1991)

- Born: 8 October 1991 (age 34) Stockholm, Sweden
- Height: 6 ft 3 in (191 cm)
- Weight: 201 lb (91 kg; 14 st 5 lb)
- Position: Defence
- Shot: Left
- Played for: Timrå IK; Kongsvinger Knights
- NHL draft: 169th overall, 2010; Atlanta Thrashers
- Playing career: 2010–2018

Sebastian Owuya (born 8 October 1991) is a Swedish former professional ice hockey player, who played in briefly in the Swedish Hockey League (Eliteserien) with Timrå IK and later with Kongsvinger Knights of the Norwegian GET-ligaen. He predominately played in the Swedish third tier, the HockeyEttan.

== Playing career ==
Owuya played one season of major junior hockey in North America with the Medicine Hat Tigers of the Western Hockey League (WHL). Owuya was drafted in the sixth-round, 169th overall, by the Atlanta Thrashers in the 2010 NHL entry draft. Sebastian's brother Mark is a goaltender who played for the Toronto Marlies. The brothers were born to a Ugandan father and a Russian mother.

== Career statistics ==
			Regular season					Playoffs
Season	Team	League	GP	G	A	Pts	PIM	GP	G	A	Pts	PIM
2008–09	Timrå IK	J20	4	0	1	1	4	—	—	—	—	—
2009–10	Timrå IK	J20	40	3	13	16	118	—	—	—	—	—
2009–10	Timrå IK	SEL	11	0	0	0	0	—	—	—	—	—
2010–11	Medicine Hat Tigers	WHL	66	0	10	10	69	14	1	5	6	18
2011–12	Stockton Thunder	ECHL	35	0	8	8	41	2	0	0	0	0
2012–13	Borås HC	Div.1	17	1	4	5	16	—	—	—	—	—
2012–13	Västerviks IK	Div.1	24	3	6	9	53	—	—	—	—	—
2013–14	IF Sundsvall	Div.1	43	1	9	10	101	2	0	0	0	4
2014–15	IF Sundsvall	Div.1	29	0	6	6	8	10	1	1	2	8
2015–16	Kongsvinger Knights	GET	41	3	9	12	62	—	—	—	—	—
2016–17	IF Sundsvall	Div.1	39	4	23	27	28	—	—	—	—	—
2017–18	Södertälje SK	Allsv	14	0	0	0	8	—	—	—	—	—
2017–18	Nyköping Gripen	Div.1	3	0	1	1	0	—	—	—	—	—
2017–18	Kallinge/Ronneby IF	Div.1	13	0	2	2	4	5	0	0	0	29
SEL totals			11	0	0	0	0	—	—	—	—	—
