= Nathan Lieuwen =

Canadian ice hockey player

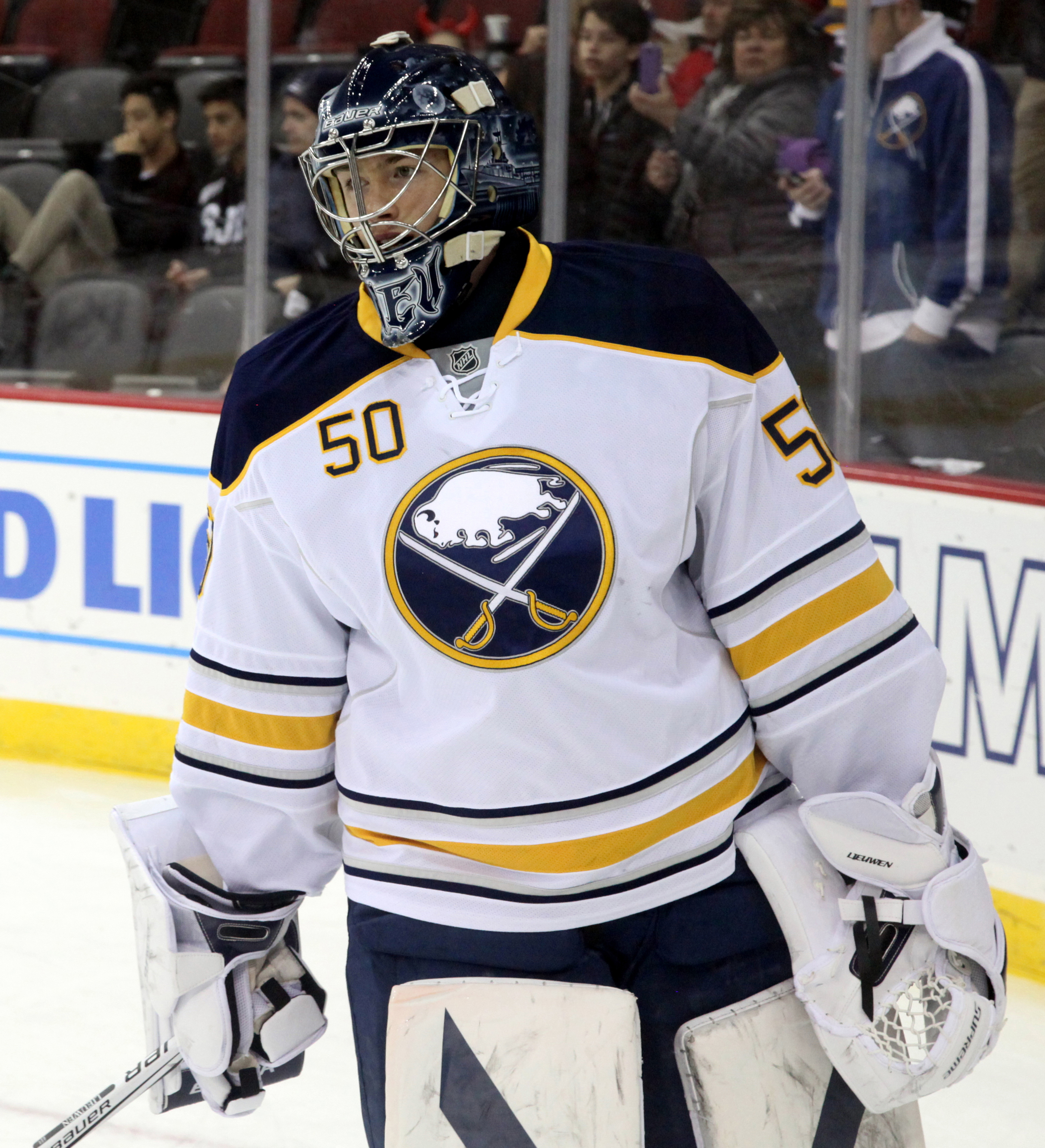
- Lieuwen with the Buffalo Sabres in April 2016
- Born: August 8, 1991 (age 35) Abbotsford, British Columbia, Canada
- Height: 6 ft 5 in (196 cm)
- Weight: 192 lb (87 kg; 13 st 10 lb)
- Position: Goaltender
- Caught: Left
- Played for: Buffalo Sabres
- NHL draft: 167th overall, 2011; Buffalo Sabres
- Playing career: 2012–2017

Nathan Lieuwen (born August 8, 1991) is a Canadian former professional ice hockey goaltender. On June 25, 2011 he was drafted by the Buffalo Sabres in the 2011 NHL entry draft. He was selected in the 6th round, 167th overall. Lieuwen briefly played for the Sabres but spent most of his career in the minor leagues, playing for the Rochester Americans and San Antonio Rampage of the American Hockey League. Multiple concussions derailed his career prospects, forcing his early retirement.

He is the majority owner and president of the junior A British Columbia Hockey League's Cranbrook Bucks, which is announced to start play in the 2020–21 BCHL season.

== Playing career ==
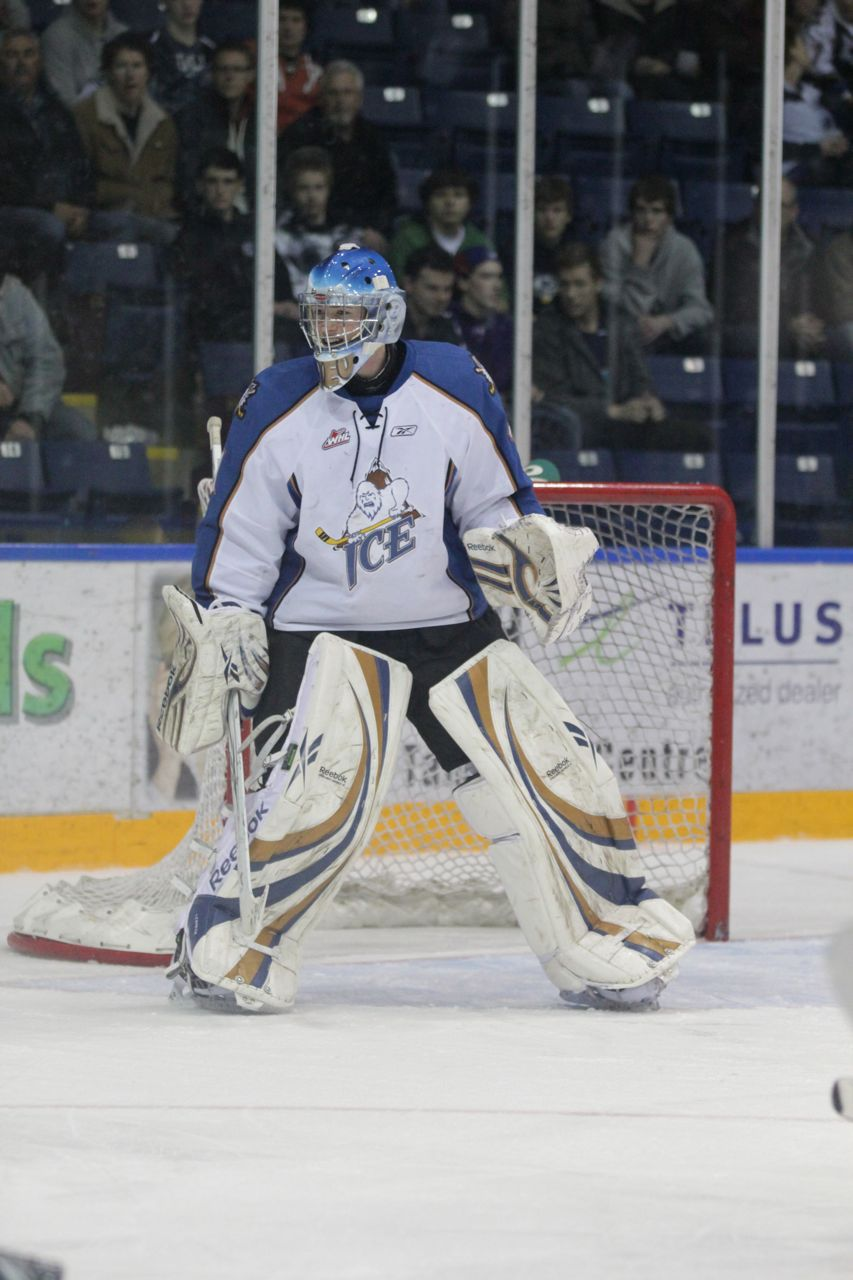
Lieuwen playing for the WHL's Kootenay Ice in 2011.

Lieuwen was selected 16th overall in the first round of the 2005 WHL Bantam Draft by the Kootenay Ice, after a championship season with the Abbotsford Hawks Bantam AAA team. Lieuwen backstopped the Hawks to the Western Canadian Championship earning Top Goalie, and All-Star awards.

In his first season with the Kootenay Ice, Lieuwen was a passenger in a roll-over car accident. Lieuwen went from a highly touted young phenom, to a WHL back-up tender, then sent down to the BCHL's Westside Warriors in Westbank, BC. That next summer he represented Canada, as the starting goaltender at the Ivan Hlinka tournament in Slovakia where Canada won the gold. Returning to the Kootenay Ice in 2008–09, Lieuwen found himself sharing ice time, and still experiencing post-concussion symptoms, all from the roll-over accident. Despite this all, he played for Team Cherry at the Home Hardware Top Prospects Game. He went undrafted later that June, and was passed over for the World Junior camps in the summer.

In his 18-year-old year with the Ice, he was still splitting ice time. After getting run over by a Calgary Hitman player, and hitting his head against the goalpost, he was sent home to recover. He later returned to the Ice, but didn't progress far into the playoffs. Lieuwen worked hard all summer to get back into the form he was in 3 years earlier. Coming back as a 19-year-old, Lieuwen helped the Ice advance deep into the playoffs, with 3 shutouts - winning 11 games in a row and eventually becoming the WHL champions and earning MVP honours (April 2011).

On May 4, 2012, Lieuwen was signed by the Buffalo Sabres to a three-year entry-level contract. On March 16, 2014, he was called up from the American Hockey League's Rochester Americans to replace the injured Michal Neuvirth, and made his NHL debut that night when he replaced an injured Jhonas Enroth in a game against the Montreal Canadiens. In 2013, Lieuwen played for the Rochester Americans at the 2013 Spengler Cup.

Lieuwen made his first NHL start on the road against the Calgary Flames on March 18, 2014. He recorded his first NHL win at home on April 1, 2014 against the New Jersey Devils. Lieuwen suffered yet another concussion in the April 6, 2014 contest, ending his season.

Lieuwen was a restricted free agent at the conclusion of the 2015–16 season. He was not tendered a qualifying offer from the Sabres, thus making him an unrestricted free agent. On July 18, 2016, Lieuwen opted to continue his career in the AHL, signing a one-year deal with the San Antonio Rampage, an affiliate to the Colorado Avalanche. Lieuwen split the 2016–17 season between the Rampage and ECHL affiliate, the Colorado Eagles, appearing in just 14 games.

The concussion Lieuwen sustained in Buffalo had long-lasting effects on his peripheral vision, which caused his on-ice performance to decline. In an effort to regain his eyesight, Lieuwen announced his retirement from hockey in May 2017.

On October 8, 2019, the British Columbia Hockey League announced the Cranbrook Bucks as an expansion team for the 2020–21 BCHL season with Lieuwen as the majority owner and president. The BCHL is a junior A league and the Bucks replace the relocated major junior Kootenay Ice.

== Career statistics ==
			Regular season									Playoffs
Season	Team	League	GP	W	L	OTL	MIN	GA	SO	GAA	SV%	GP	W	L	MIN	GA	SO	GAA	SV%
2007–08	Westside Warriors	BCHL	13	9	2	0	710	23	0	1.95	.931	—	—	—	—	—	—	—	—
2007–08	Kootenay Ice	WHL	3	1	1	1	184	10	0	3.27	.910	—	—	—	—	—	—	—	—
2008–09	Kootenay Ice	WHL	37	14	12	2	1915	94	3	2.95	.885	—	—	—	—	—	—	—	—
2009–10	Kootenay Ice	WHL	26	10	10	0	1244	64	0	3.09	.896	3	0	1	125	4	0	1.91	.892
2010–11	Kootenay Ice	WHL	55	33	16	4	3098	144	3	2.79	.903	19	16	3	1178	44	3	2.24	.923
2011–12	Kootenay Ice	WHL	57	27	20	8	3340	139	3	2.50	.914	4	0	4	238	14	0	3.53	.896
2012–13	Greenville Road Warriors	ECHL	27	14	10	2	1598	78	1	2.93	.903	—	—	—	—	—	—	—	—
2012–13	Rochester Americans	AHL	4	1	2	0	204	9	1	2.65	.919	—	—	—	—	—	—	—	—
2013–14	Rochester Americans	AHL	32	17	11	2	1796	70	2	2.34	.922	—	—	—	—	—	—	—	—
2013–14	Buffalo Sabres	NHL	7	1	4	0	363	18	0	2.98	.906	—	—	—	—	—	—	—	—
2014–15	Rochester Americans	AHL	16	4	9	0	821	45	0	3.29	.883	—	—	—	—	—	—	—	—
2015–16	Rochester Americans	AHL	28	14	11	2	1590	77	2	2.91	.909	—	—	—	—	—	—	—	—
2016–17	Colorado Eagles	ECHL	12	6	2	1	656	38	0	3.48	.882	—	—	—	—	—	—	—	—
2016–17	San Antonio Rampage	AHL	2	0	1	0	78	5	0	3.83	.792	—	—	—	—	—	—	—	—
NHL totals			7	1	4	0	363	18	0	2.98	.906	—	—	—	—	—	—	—	—

== Awards and honours ==
Awards	Year
WHL
Playoff MVP	2010–11
