= Sena Acolatse =

American-Canadian ice hockey player (born 1990)

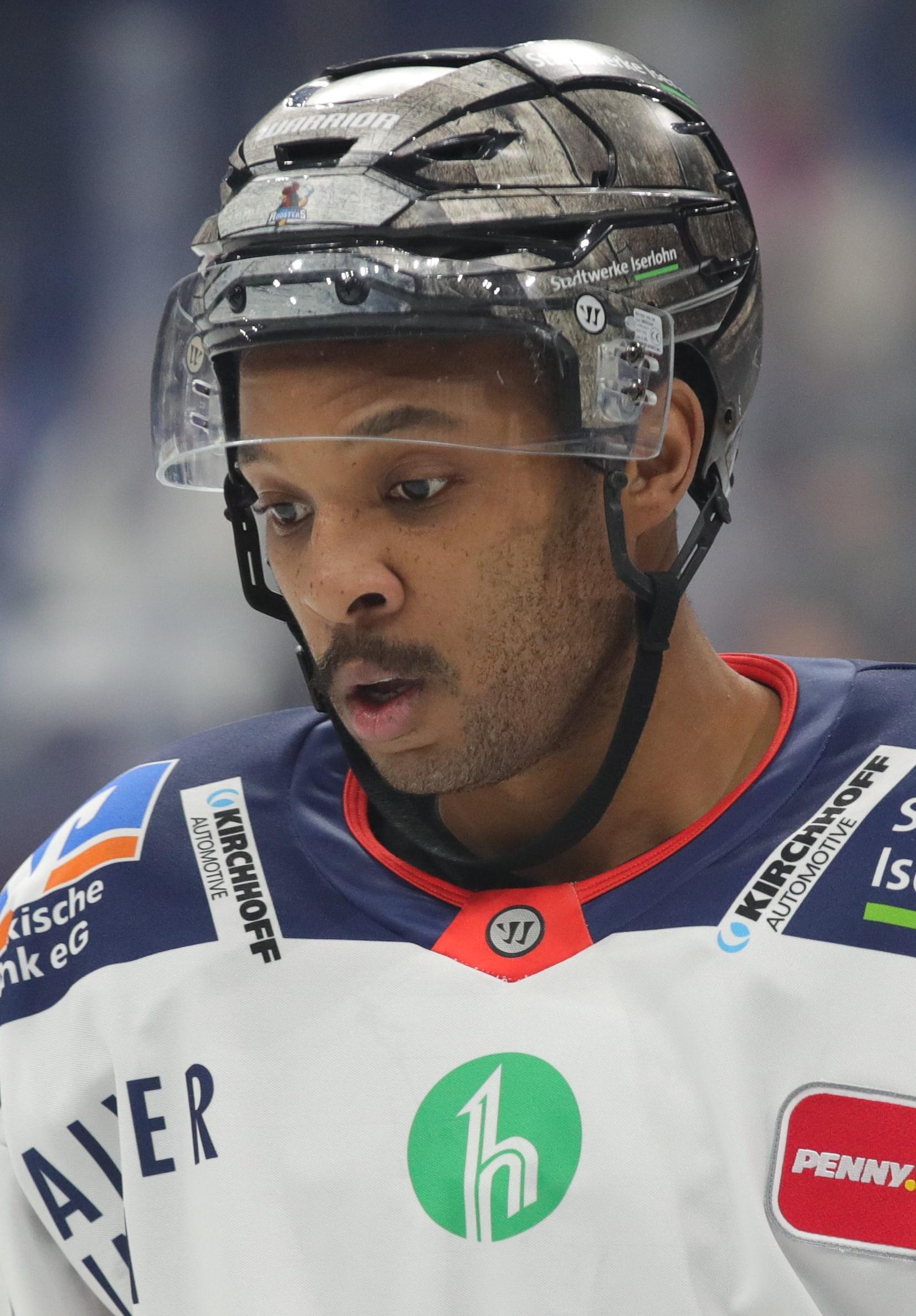
- Sena Acolatse, 2022
- Born: November 28, 1990 (age 35) Hayward, California, U.S.
- Height: 6 ft 0 in (183 cm)
- Weight: 210 lb (95 kg; 15 st 0 lb)
- Position: Defense
- Shoots: Right
- Slovak team Former teams: HC Slovan Bratislava; Worcester Sharks; Adirondack Flames; Portland Pirates; Springfield Thunderbirds; Providence Bruins; Straubing Tigers; Iserlohn Roosters; HK Dukla Michalovce
- NHL draft: Undrafted
- Playing career: 2011–present

Sena Wendell Acolatse (born November 28, 1990) is an American-Canadian professional ice hockey player who is currently playing for HC Slovan Bratislava of the Slovak Extraliga (Slovak).

== Playing career ==
Prior to turning professional, Acolatse played major junior hockey in the Western Hockey League (WHL). Acolatse was drafted by the WHL's Seattle Thunderbirds in the 2005 Bantam Draft in the fourth round, 76th overall. Acolatse played in the WHL for five seasons. He played for Seattle for three and a half years before being traded to the Saskatoon Blades in January 2010. The Prince George Cougars acquired Acolatse from the Saskatoon Blades on October 3, 2010.

On April 3, 2011, the San Jose Sharks signed Acolatse as an undrafted free agent to a three-year entry-level contract. He was assigned to AHL affiliate, the Worcester Sharks, for the duration of his contract.

Upon completion of his entry-level deal, Acolatse was not tendered a qualifying offer from the Sharks, releasing him as a free agent. On July 3, 2014, Acolatse signed a one-year, two-way contract with the Calgary Flames. He was assigned to AHL affiliate, the Adirondack Flames for the 2014–15 season.

Acolatse suffered a repeat of the previous off-season in not being tendered by the Flames. On July 1, 2015, he was signed as a free agent to a one-year, two-way contract with the Florida Panthers. In the 2015–16 season, Acolatse was assigned to remain in the AHL with affiliate, the Portland Pirates. As a regular on the blueline with the Pirates, Acolatse appeared in 62 games with 13 points.

After a further two seasons with the Springfield Thunderbirds and Providence Bruins, Acolatse left the AHL at the conclusion of the 2017–18 season, agreeing to his first contract abroad on a one-year deal with German outfit, Straubing Tigers of the DEL on May 4, 2018. After three years in Straubing, Sena Acolatse moved to the Iserlohn Roosters in the summer of 2021.

In his second year with the Roosters in 2022–23, Acolatse matched his previous season totals with 23 points through 45 regular season games. With Iserlohn missing the playoffs for the second consecutive season, Acolatse left the club at the conclusion of his contract on March 10, 2023.

== Career statistics ==
			Regular season					Playoffs
Season	Team	League	GP	G	A	Pts	PIM	GP	G	A	Pts	PIM
2006–07	Seattle Thunderbirds	WHL	45	0	4	4	61	11	0	0	0	8
2007–08	Seattle Thunderbirds	WHL	71	7	24	31	107	12	1	2	3	12
2008–09	Seattle Thunderbirds	WHL	70	7	14	21	143	5	1	1	2	0
2009–10	Seattle Thunderbirds	WHL	39	13	9	22	35	—	—	—	—	—
2009–10	Saskatoon Blades	WHL	30	3	10	13	25	7	1	1	2	17
2010–11	Saskatoon Blades	WHL	1	0	0	0	2	—	—	—	—	—
2010–11	Prince George Cougars	WHL	66	15	48	63	128	4	3	4	7	4
2010–11	Worcester Sharks	AHL	1	0	0	0	0	—	—	—	—	—
2011–12	Worcester Sharks	AHL	65	8	13	21	89	—	—	—	—	—
2012–13	Worcester Sharks	AHL	50	4	17	21	62	—	—	—	—	—
2013–14	Worcester Sharks	AHL	41	5	12	17	66	—	—	—	—	—
2014–15	Adirondack Flames	AHL	38	6	13	19	68	—	—	—	—	—
2015–16	Portland Pirates	AHL	62	8	5	13	138	3	1	0	1	2
2016–17	Springfield Thunderbirds	AHL	68	6	17	23	147	—	—	—	—	—
2017–18	Providence Bruins	AHL	30	1	7	8	90	—	—	—	—	—
2018–19	Straubing Tigers	DEL	46	0	11	11	173	—	—	—	—	—
2019–20	Straubing Tigers	DEL	47	10	20	30	75	—	—	—	—	—
2020–21	Straubing Tigers	DEL	33	6	6	12	34	3	1	1	2	2
2021–22	Iserlohn Roosters	DEL	43	10	13	23	60	—	—	—	—	—
2022–23	Iserlohn Roosters	DEL	45	4	19	23	41	—	—	—	—	—
2023–24	HK Dukla Michalovce	Slovak	36	11	22	33	81	6	0	1	1	60
AHL totals			355	38	84	122	660	3	1	0	1	2
