= James Reid (ice hockey) =

Canadian ice hockey player

- Born: December 15, 1990 (age 35) Calgary, Alberta, Canada
- Height: 6 ft 0 in (183 cm)
- Weight: 190 lb (86 kg; 13 st 8 lb)
- Position: Goaltender
- Caught: Right
- Played for: Lake Erie Monsters
- NHL draft: Undrafted
- Playing career: 2011–2013

James Reid (born December 15, 1990) is a Canadian former professional ice hockey goaltender. He last played for the Evansville IceMen of the ECHL.

== Career ==
After a junior career with the Spokane Chiefs in the Western Hockey League, he is the Spokane Chiefs all-time leader in regular season wins with 85, Reid was signed to a contract to make his professional debut with the Lake Erie Monsters of the American Hockey League (AHL) in the 2011–12 season. He also played part of the season on loan with the Allen Americans of the Central Hockey League (CHL) and Alaska Aces of the ECHL.

== Career statistics ==
			Regular season									Playoffs
Season	Team	League	GP	W	L	T/OT	MIN	GA	SO	GAA	SV%	GP	W	L	MIN	GA	SO	GAA	SV%
2007–08	Calgary Canucks	AJHL	23	10	11	2	1326	73	0	3.30	.890	—	—	—	—	—	—	—	—
2008–09	Spokane Chiefs	WHL	18	12	5	1	1074	30	4	1.68	.940	—	—	—	—	—	—	—	—
2009–10	Spokane Chiefs	WHL	60	38	16	5	3514	141	5	2.41	.920	7	3	4	427	24	0	3.37	.911
2010–11	Spokane Chiefs	WHL	50	35	9	3	2808	118	4	2.52	.904	17	10	7	1071	46	1	2.58	.906
2011–12	Lake Erie Monsters	AHL	5	0	1	0	173	12	0	4.17	.859	—	—	—	—	—	—	—	—
2011–12	Allen Americans	CHL	3	0	3	0	176	14	0	4.77	.867	—	—	—	—	—	—	—	—
2011–12	Alaska Aces	ECHL	9	6	2	1	544	19	0	2.09	.910	1	0	0	40	0	0	0.00	1.000
2012–13	Alaska Aces	ECHL	2	1	1	0	120	8	0	4.00	.822	—	—	—	—	—	—	—	—
2012–13	Orlando Solar Bears	ECHL	1	0	0	0	15	3	0	11.65	.750	—	—	—	—	—	—	—	—
2012–13	Evansville IceMen	ECHL	12	3	7	2	724	46	0	3.81	.890	—	—	—	—	—	—	—	—
AHL totals			5	0	1	0	173	12	0	4.17	.859	—	—	—	—	—	—	—	—

== Awards and honors ==
Award	Year
WHL
West First All-Star Team	2011
