= Kevin Sundher =

Canadian ice hockey player

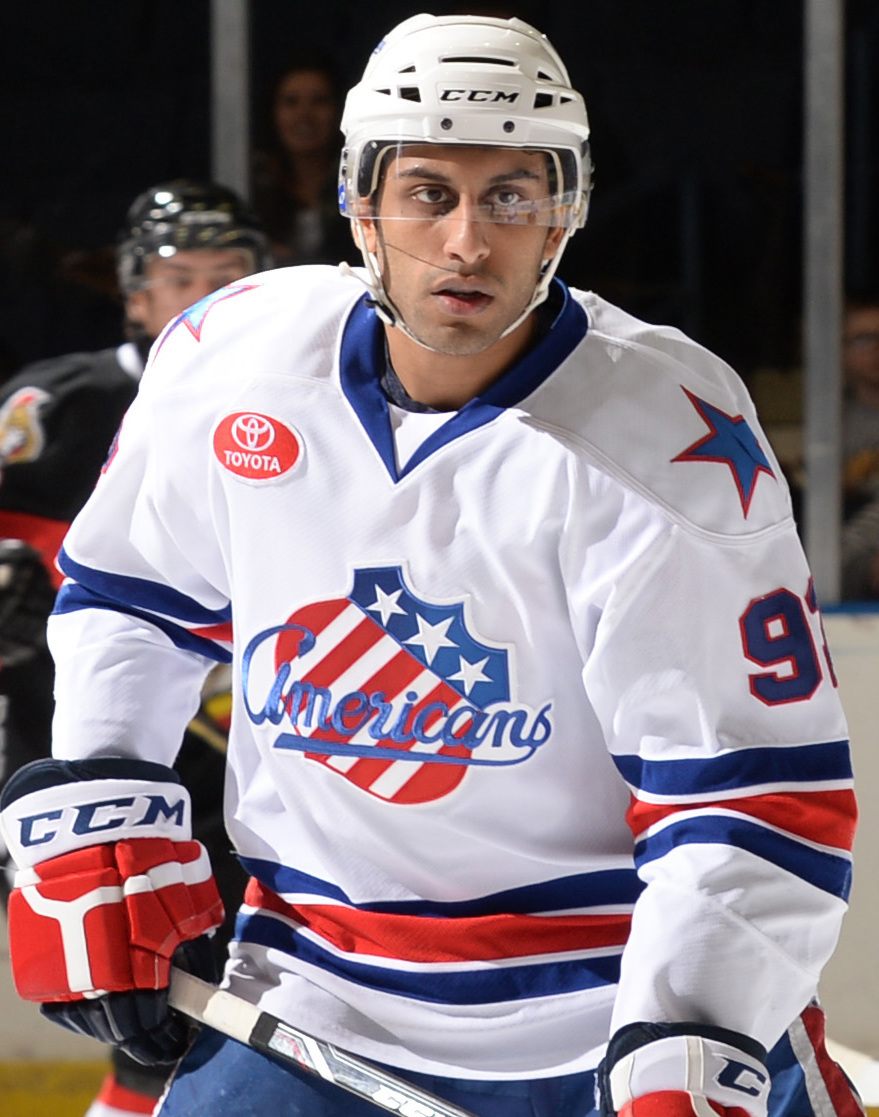
- Sundher with the Rochester Americans in 2014
- Born: January 18, 1992 (age 34) Surrey, British Columbia, Canada
- Height: 6 ft 0 in (183 cm)
- Weight: 179 lb (81 kg; 12 st 11 lb)
- Position: Centre
- Shot: Left
- Played for: Rochester Americans; Lehigh Valley Phantoms; HC Olomouc; Sparta Warriors
- NHL draft: 75th overall, 2010; Buffalo Sabres
- Playing career: 2012–2019

Kevin Sundher (born January 18, 1992) is a former Canadian professional ice hockey forward who played in the American Hockey League (AHL) and the Czech Extraliga. Sundher was drafted by the Buffalo Sabres in the third round of the 2010 NHL entry draft.

== Playing career ==
On December 15, 2011, Sundher was signed to a three-year entry-level contract with the Buffalo Sabres. He was assigned to their AHL affiliate, the Rochester Americans for the duration of his contract.

As a free agent and with little NHL interest, Sundher opted to sign a one-year contract in the ECHL with the Reading Royals on September 22, 2015. His season was ultimately shortened by a leg injury he suffered while playing for the AHL's Lehigh Valley Phantoms on a professional tryout. He signed an AHL contract with the Phantoms on August 16, 2016, but spent most of the season in Reading before being released from his contract so he could sign for the remainder of the season with HC Olomouc of the Czech Extraliga.

Sundher signed an extension to remain with HC Olomouc for the 2017–18 season. He again made a midseason team change, being released by HC Olomouc and signing with the Sparta Warriors of the Norwegian GET-ligaen on January 15, 2018. In the off-season he opted to return to North America by signing a contract with the ECHL's Allen Americans for the 2018–19 season.

== Career statistics ==
			Regular season					Playoffs
Season	Team	League	GP	G	A	Pts	PIM	GP	G	A	Pts	PIM
2007–08	Chilliwack Bruins	WHL	6	0	1	1	2	—	—	—	—	—
2008–09	Chilliwack Bruins	WHL	67	19	20	39	68	—	—	—	—	—
2009–10	Chilliwack Bruins	WHL	72	25	36	61	101	6	3	2	5	4
2010–11	Chilliwack Bruins	WHL	70	24	52	76	93	5	3	4	7	6
2011–12	Victoria Royals	WHL	40	22	42	64	51	—	—	—	—	—
2011–12	Brandon Wheat Kings	WHL	18	4	7	11	12	9	1	2	3	9
2012–13	Rochester Americans	AHL	38	4	9	13	26	—	—	—	—	—
2013–14	Rochester Americans	AHL	60	6	14	20	25	—	—	—	—	—
2014–15	Rochester Americans	AHL	31	1	4	5	12	—	—	—	—	—
2014–15	Elmira Jackals	ECHL	9	1	3	4	2	—	—	—	—	—
2015–16	Reading Royals	ECHL	9	5	5	10	0	6	1	2	3	2
2015–16	Lehigh Valley Phantoms	AHL	10	3	2	5	8	—	—	—	—	—
2016–17	Reading Royals	ECHL	32	5	12	17	27	—	—	—	—	—
2016–17	HC Olomouc	ELH	10	1	1	2	6	—	—	—	—	—
2017–18	HC Olomouc	ELH	28	5	4	9	12	—	—	—	—	—
2017–18	Sparta Warriors	GET	7	2	0	2	10	10	0	2	2	2
2018–19	Allen Americans	ECHL	8	0	1	1	0	—	—	—	—	—
ELH totals			38	6	5	11	18	—	—	—	—	—
