= Max Reinhart =

Canadian ice hockey player (born 1992)

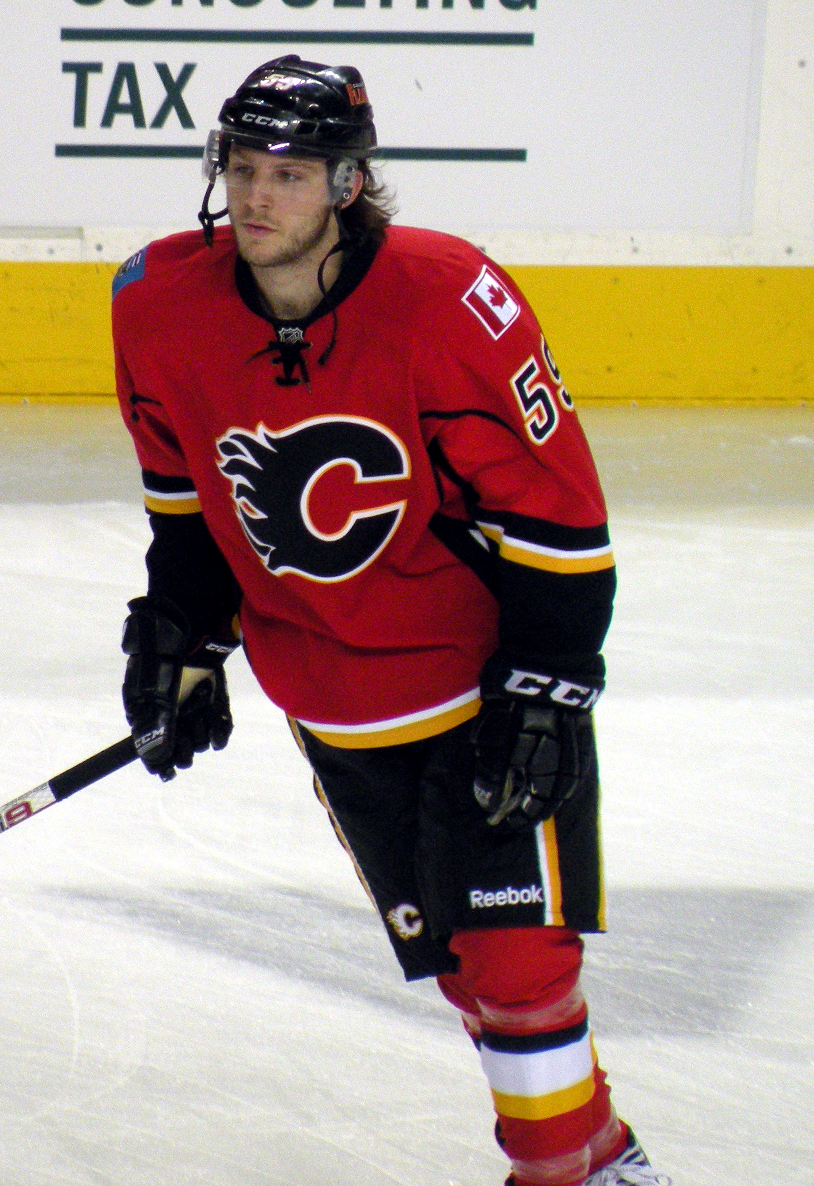
- Reinhart with the Calgary Flames in 2013
- Born: February 4, 1992 (age 34) Vancouver, British Columbia, Canada
- Height: 6 ft 0 in (183 cm)
- Weight: 181 lb (82 kg; 12 st 13 lb)
- Position: Centre
- Shot: Left
- Played for: Calgary Flames; Kölner Haie
- NHL draft: 64th overall, 2010; Calgary Flames
- Playing career: 2012–2018

Maxwell Reinhart (born February 4, 1992) is a Canadian former professional ice hockey player. He played in the NHL for the Calgary Flames.

Reinhart played four seasons of junior hockey with the Kootenay Ice and was a member of their 2011 Western Hockey League championship team before turning professional in 2012. Along with Griffin and Sam, he is one of three hockey-playing brothers, the sons of former NHL player Paul Reinhart.

== Playing career ==
=== Junior ===
Reinhart played minor hockey in West Vancouver, British Columbia, where his father Paul, a former National Hockey League (NHL) player, settled following his career. Max viewed his father as the greatest influence on his development as a player, and found that being the son of a former NHL player made it easier for him to be noticed by scouts. He was drafted into the Western Hockey League (WHL) by the Kootenay Ice with their fourth round selection, 86th overall, at the 2007 WHL Bantam Draft.

As a junior, Reinhart played four seasons at centre with the Ice between 2008 and 2012 where he scored 235 points in 266 games. Following a 27-point campaign as a 16-year-old in 2008–09, he improved to 51 points in 2009–10 and earned a spot with the Canadian under-18 team at the 2010 IIHF World U18 Championships. Reinhart appeared in six games in the tournament, scoring one assist for the seventh-placed Canadians. Reinhart was selected in the third round (63rd overall) at the 2010 NHL entry draft by the Calgary Flames, the same franchise that drafted his father 12th overall in 1979.

Returning to the Ice for the 2010–11 WHL season, Reinhart finished second in team scoring, behind Cody Eakin, with 79 points in 71 games. In the 2011 playoffs, he tied a league record becoming the fourth player in league history to score five goals in one game in a 7–2 victory over the Medicine Hat Tigers. Reinhart scored 27 points in 19 playoff games, tying five players for second overall in post-season scoring, as the Ice won the Ed Chynoweth Cup after defeating the Portland Winterhawks in the WHL championship series. Playing his final season of junior in 2011–12, Reinhart led the Ice with 78 points, and was named to the WHL Second All-Star Team.

=== Professional ===
The Flames signed Reinhart to a three-year entry-level contract on July 14, 2011, before his final season with the Ice. He made his professional debut after the Ice's season ended. Reinhart joined Calgary's American Hockey League (AHL) affiliate, the Abbotsford Heat, to conclude the 2011–12 AHL season, where he scored two goals in his professional debut. He added a goal and an assist in four playoff games. In his first full season with the Heat in 2012–13, Reinhart struggled to play at a consistent level; the 21-year-old said he hadn't had many years in hockey where he struggled offensively. He had only four points in his first 33 games with Abbotsford, but improved throughout the season, scoring 17 points in his following 34 games.

The Calgary Flames recalled Reinhart on April 6, 2013, a decision that surprised him despite his improved play. He made his NHL debut that night in his hometown, a 5–2 loss to the Vancouver Canucks. Reinhart made his debut with the Flames franchise that his father began his own career with and played nine seasons for, and against a Canucks team that Paul spent his final two seasons with. Reinhart earned his first NHL point four nights later, also against the Canucks, assisting on a Curtis Glencross goal, and scored his first goal against Edmonton Oilers' goaltender Nikolai Khabibulin on April 13 in a 4–1 victory. He finished the season with a goal and two assists in 11 games with the Flames, and 21 points in 67 games with Abbotsford.

Reinhart spent the majority of the 2013–14 season with the Heat, though he appeared in eight games with the Flames and recorded two assists. He led the Heat with 63 points in 66 games, and in doing so, broke Krys Kolanos' Abbotsford team scoring record (61).

On July 1, 2015, Reinhart was traded by the Flames to the Nashville Predators in exchange for a conditional fourth-round selection in 2016. He did not see any NHL action during the 2015–16 season, but made 73 appearances for Nashville's AHL affiliate, the Milwaukee Admirals, tallying 23 goals and 15 assists. He also played three postseason contests.

In the following off-season, Reinhart took up an offer from Germany, signing with Kölner Haie of the Deutsche Eishockey Liga (DEL) on June 6, 2016. In the 2016–17 season, Reinhart provided versatility throughout the lineup, providing 6 goals and 23 points in 52 games.

On July 1, 2017, Reinhart returned to the NHL, signing as a free agent to a one-year, two-way contract with the Ottawa Senators.

== Personal life ==
Max is the eldest of three sons to Paul and Theresa Reinhart. His younger brothers also play hockey: Griffin was a first-round draft pick of the New York Islanders in 2012, and youngest brother Sam plays for the Florida Panthers having been drafted by the Buffalo Sabres in the 2014 NHL entry draft. The three brothers played with and against each other throughout their junior careers, as Sam was a teammate of Max's on Kootenay's championship team while the pair opposed Griffin, who was a member of the Edmonton Oil Kings. Reinhart is the only one of the brothers who was not drafted in the first round of the NHL Entry Draft.

== Career statistics ==
=== Regular season and playoffs ===
			Regular season					Playoffs
Season	Team	League	GP	G	A	Pts	PIM	GP	G	A	Pts	PIM
2008–09	Kootenay Ice	WHL	62	11	16	27	21	4	1	0	1	2
2009–10	Kootenay Ice	WHL	72	21	30	51	38	6	1	1	2	6
2010–11	Kootenay Ice	WHL	71	34	45	79	41	19	15	12	27	12
2011–12	Kootenay Ice	WHL	61	28	50	78	40	3	0	2	2	6
2011–12	Abbotsford Heat	AHL	1	2	0	2	0	4	1	1	2	0
2012–13	Abbotsford Heat	AHL	67	7	14	21	32	—	—	—	—	—
2012–13	Calgary Flames	NHL	11	1	2	3	4	—	—	—	—	—
2013–14	Abbotsford Heat	AHL	66	21	42	63	47	4	1	3	4	4
2013–14	Calgary Flames	NHL	8	0	2	2	2	—	—	—	—	—
2014–15	Adirondack Flames	AHL	69	15	24	39	38	—	—	—	—	—
2014–15	Calgary Flames	NHL	4	0	0	0	0	—	—	—	—	—
2015–16	Milwaukee Admirals	AHL	73	23	15	38	32	3	0	0	0	4
2016–17	Kölner Haie	DEL	52	6	17	23	26	3	0	0	0	4
2017–18	Belleville Senators	AHL	67	11	12	23	32	—	—	—	—	—
NHL totals			23	1	4	5	6	—	—	—	—	—

=== International ===
Year	Team	Event	Result	GP	G	A	Pts	PIM
2009	Canada Pacific	U17	2nd place, silver medalist(s)	6	2	1	3	4
2010	Canada	WJC18	7th	6	0	1	1	39
Junior totals				12	2	2	4	43

== Awards and honours ==
Medal record

Representing Canada

Ice hockey

World U-17 Hockey Challenge
Silver medal – second place	2009 British Columbia	

Award	Year
WHL
Championship	2010–11
Second Team All-Star	2011–12

== See also ==
- List of family relations in the NHL
