= Curtis Hamilton (ice hockey) =

American-born Canadian ice hockey player

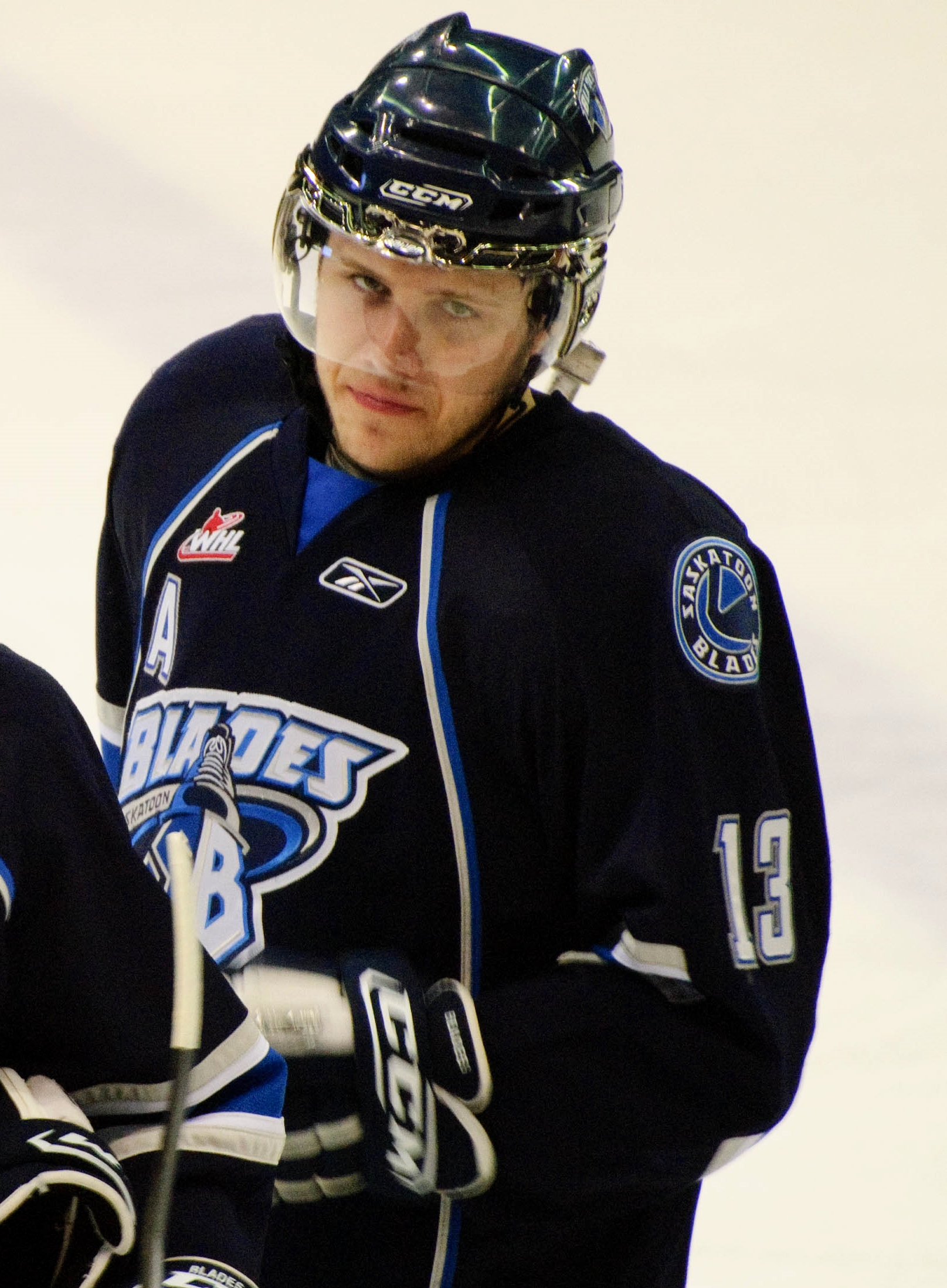
- Curtis Hamilton with the Saskatoon Blades (2011)
- Born: December 4, 1991 (age 34) Tacoma, Washington, U S.
- Height: 6 ft 2 in (188 cm)
- Weight: 212 lb (96 kg; 15 st 2 lb)
- Position: Left wing
- Shot: Left
- Played for: Edmonton Oilers; HC Sparta Prague; SaiPa; HC TPS; Tappara; Graz 99ers Belfast Giants; Manchester Storm
- NHL draft: 48th overall, 2010; Edmonton Oilers
- Playing career: 2011–2022

Curtis Hamilton (born December 4, 1991) is an American-born Canadian retired professional ice hockey forward. He last played with the Manchester Storm in the British Elite Ice Hockey League (EIHL). Hamilton previously skated for the Graz 99ers in the Austrian Hockey League (EBEL). Hamilton was selected by the Edmonton Oilers in the 2nd round (48th overall) of the 2010 NHL entry draft, with whom he played his one NHL regular season game.

== Playing career ==
Hamilton was born in Tacoma, Washington, but grew up in Kelowna, British Columbia when his father, Bruce owned the Tacoma Rockets (which relocated to Kelowna in 1995). Before turning professional, he played major junior hockey in the Western Hockey League (WHL) with the Saskatoon Blades.

On April 18, 2011, the Edmonton Oilers signed Hamilton to a three-year entry-level contract. In his fourth season within the Oilers organization in 2014–15, Hamilton was recalled from the Oklahoma City Barons and made his NHL debut, going scoreless in his solitary game with the Oilers.

As a free agent over the summer, Hamilton was unable to attract NHL interest and on September 30, 2015, he signed his first European contract by agreeing to a one-year deal with Czech club, HC Sparta Prague of the Czech Extraliga.

On July 26, 2018, Hamilton continued his career in Europe by leaving Finland and agreeing to a one-year contract with Austrian outfit, Graz 99ers of the EBEL.

In August 2019 Hamilton moved to the UK to sign for EIHL side Belfast Giants.

After an inactive season due to the Coronavirus pandemic, Hamilton returned to hockey by signing with fellow EIHL side Manchester Storm in August 2021.

== Personal ==
His father, Bruce Hamilton, was drafted 81st overall by the St. Louis Blues in the 1977 NHL amateur draft, and is the current owner and general manager of the WHL's Kelowna Rockets. Hamilton was born in Tacoma, Washington when the franchise was known as the Tacoma Rockets. He was raised in Kelowna, British Columbia after his father relocated the franchise to the city in 1995.

== Career statistics ==
=== Regular season and playoffs ===
			Regular season					Playoffs
Season	Team	League	GP	G	A	Pts	PIM	GP	G	A	Pts	PIM
2006–07	Saskatoon Blades	WHL	2	0	0	0	0	—	—	—	—	—
2007–08	Saskatoon Blades	WHL	68	14	13	27	43	—	—	—	—	—
2008–09	Saskatoon Blades	WHL	58	20	28	48	24	7	1	1	2	2
2009–10	Saskatoon Blades	WHL	26	7	9	16	6	5	2	1	3	6
2010–11	Saskatoon Blades	WHL	62	26	56	82	22	10	4	7	11	4
2011–12	Oklahoma City Barons	AHL	41	5	6	11	8	2	0	0	0	2
2012–13	Oklahoma City Barons	AHL	61	5	4	9	10	1	0	0	0	0
2013–14	Oklahoma City Barons	AHL	43	8	8	16	23	3	1	0	1	2
2014–15	Oklahoma City Barons	AHL	63	12	20	32	38	10	1	1	2	6
2014–15	Edmonton Oilers	NHL	1	0	0	0	5	—	—	—	—	—
2015–16	HC Sparta Praha	ELH	43	13	17	30	20	0	0	0	0	0
2016–17	SaiPa	Liiga	43	14	13	27	14	—	—	—	—	—
2016–17	TPS	Liiga	2	1	0	1	0	—	—	—	—	—
2017–18	Tappara	Liiga	5	0	0	0	0	—	—	—	—	—
2017–18	SaiPa	Liiga	16	3	5	8	6	9	2	3	5	4
2018–19	Graz 99ers	EBEL	54	17	23	40	22	10	1	2	3	0
2019–20	Belfast Giants	EIHL	45	16	17	33	16	—	—	—	—	—
2021–22	Manchester Storm	EIHL	54	13	13	26	30	—	—	—	—	—
NHL totals			1	0	0	0	5	—	—	—	—	—

Medal record

Ice hockey

Representing Canada

IIHF World U20 Championship
Silver medal – second place	2011 United States	

=== International ===
Year	Team	Event	Result	GP	G	A	Pts	PIM
2009	Canada	WJC18	4th	6	1	4	5	4
2011	Canada	WJC	2nd place, silver medalist(s)	7	4	0	4	2
Junior totals				13	5	4	9	6

== See also ==
- List of players who played only one game in the NHL
