= Josh Nicholls =

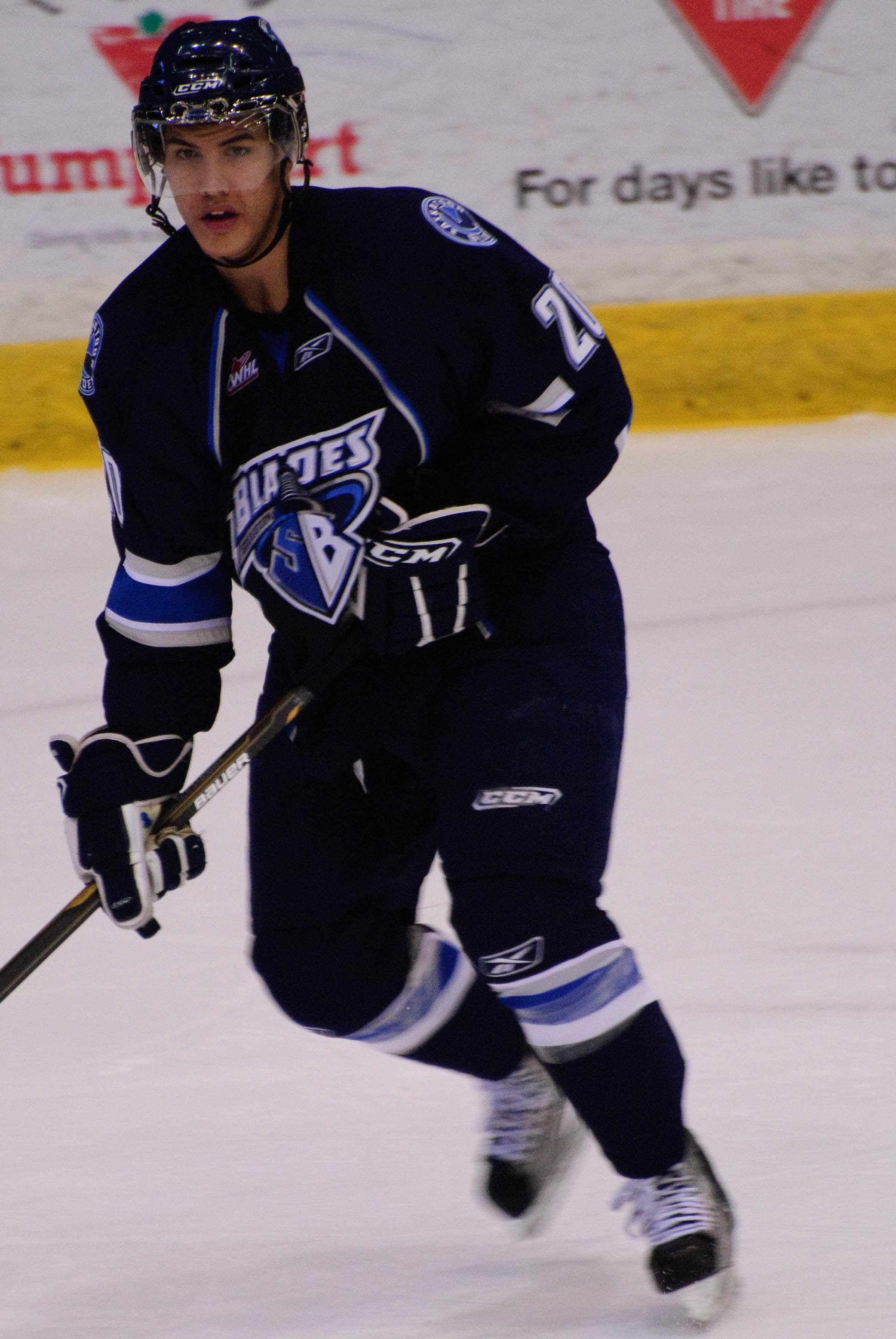
- Nicholls with the Saskatoon Blades in 2011
- Born: April 27, 1992 (age 34) Tsawwassen, British Columbia, Canada
- Height: 6 ft 2 in (188 cm)
- Weight: 189 lb (86 kg; 13 st 7 lb)
- Position: Right wing
- Shoots: Right
- Ligue Magnus team Former teams: Ducs d'Angers; Hartford Wolf Pack; Straubing Tigers; HC Litvínov; Storhamar Ishockey; Kunlun Red Star; Sheffield Steelers
- NHL draft: 182nd overall, 2010; Toronto Maple Leafs
- Playing career: 2013–present

Josh Nicholls (born April 27, 1992) is a Filipino-Canadian professional ice hockey right wing who plays for French Ligue Magnus side Ducs d'Angers. He most recently played for the Kunlun Red Star of the Kontinental Hockey League (KHL). He was drafted by the Toronto Maple Leafs in the 7th round, 182nd overall of the 2010 NHL entry draft.

== Career statistics ==
=== Regular season and playoffs ===
			Regular season					Playoffs
Season	Team	League	GP	G	A	Pts	PIM	GP	G	A	Pts	PIM
2008–09	Saskatoon Blades	WHL	63	9	16	25	37	7	2	0	2	4
2009–10	Saskatoon Blades	WHL	71	18	30	48	55	10	0	5	5	6
2010–11	Saskatoon Blades	WHL	71	34	53	87	47	10	4	2	6	6
2011–12	Saskatoon Blades	WHL	56	30	38	68	24	4	2	1	3	2
2012–13	Saskatoon Blades	WHL	71	47	38	85	43	4	0	1	1	9
2013–14	Greenville Road Warriors	ECHL	63	20	22	42	20	18	6	9	15	14
2013–14	Hartford Wolf Pack	AHL	6	0	0	0	0	—	—	—	—	—
2014–15	Greenville Road Warriors	ECHL	53	21	22	43	20	—	—	—	—	—
2014–15	Hartford Wolf Pack	AHL	5	0	1	1	0	—	—	—	—	—
2015–16	Greenville Swamp Rabbits	ECHL	58	21	24	45	32	—	—	—	—	—
2015–16	Hartford Wolf Pack	AHL	11	1	2	3	4	—	—	—	—	—
2016–17	Colorado Eagles	ECHL	30	11	21	32	10	—	—	—	—	—
2016–17	Straubing Tigers	DEL	6	1	3	4	2	1	0	0	0	0
2017–18	HC Litvínov	CZE	8	0	2	2	2	—	—	—	—	—
2017–18	Storhamar Ishockey	NOR	22	13	7	20	12	11	9	9	18	14
2018–19	Kunlun Red Star	KHL	16	0	1	1	4	—	—	—	—	—
2018–19	ORG Beijing	VHL	4	2	2	4	0	—	—	—	—	—
2019–20	ORG Beijing	VHL	15	4	6	10	0	—	—	—	—	—
2020–21	Kunlun Red Star	KHL	4	0	0	0	0	—	—	—	—	—
2020–21	Heilbronner Falken	DEL2	32	8	23	31	4	3	0	3	3	0
2021–22	Kunlun Red Star	KHL	36	4	12	16	4	—	—	—	—	—
2021–22	Storhamar Ishockey	NOR	15	4	4	8	6	15	8	5	13	2
2022–23	Kunlun Red Star	KHL	30	0	2	2	10	—	—	—	—	—
2023-24	Sheffield Steelers	EIHL	52	18	22	40	16	4	1	3	4	0
KHL totals			86	4	15	19	18	—	—	—	—	—

=== International ===
Year	Team	Event	Result	GP	G	A	Pts	PIM
2009	Canada Pacific	U17	2nd place, silver medalist(s)	6	0	3	3	8
Junior totals				6	0	3	3	8
