= Western Financial Place =

Aquatics centre in Cranbrook, British Columbia

Coordinates: 49.5137°N 115.75626°W

- Interactive map of Western Financial Place
- Location: 1777 2nd Street North; Cranbrook, British Columbia; V1C 7G9
- Owner: City of Cranbrook
- Operator: City of Cranbrook
- Capacity: Hockey: 4,654; Concerts: 6,000
- Surface: Multi-surface

Construction
- Groundbreaking: 1998
- Opened: October 13, 2000
- Cost: $22.6 million ($38.9 million in 2025 dollars)
- Architects: Vic Davies Architect (2003) Ltd. PBK Architects Inc.
- General contractor: TASK Construction Management

Tenants
- Kootenay Ice (WHL) (2000–2019); Cranbrook Bucks (BCHL) (2020–)

Western Financial Place (formerly known as the Cranbrook Recreational Complex) is a 4,268-seat (plus 352 standing room) arena and an aquatics centre which is located in the East Kootenay's in the town of Cranbrook, British Columbia. Western Financial Place is a multi-purpose recreational facility. The arena is a standard National Hockey League size rink, measuring 200 feet long and 85 feet wide.

It was built in 2000 and it has hosted many events and concerts since its opening. It serves as an arena for the Vancouver Canucks practice sessions, a Superdogs show, monster truck shows, a number of Champions of Skating performances and the Husky Skate the Nation performances. It also was home to the Kootenay Ice WHL major junior ice hockey team.

The arena has been the host of two circus groups. The Circus Gatti and Cirque Sublime performed their show "Adamo" here.

== Closure and reopening ==
Due to the COVID-19 pandemic the complex was forced to close in March, 2020 due to the restrictions put in place by the provincial government of British Columbia. It was announced that the complex would reopen on November 2, 2020 with strict access rules and a number of facility changes to accommodate restrictions.

During the closure, the City of Cranbrook budgeted $3.55 million for the reconstruction of the roof and arena upgrades. The construction process was carried out under COVID-19 protocols and without the general public.
