= 2011–12 WHL season =

- League: Western Hockey League
- Sport: Ice hockey
- Duration: Regular season September 22, 2011 – March 18, 2012; Playoffs; March 22, 2012 – May 13, 2012
- Teams: 22
- TV partner(s): Shaw TV, Rogers Sportsnet, Root Sports Northwest

Regular season
- Scotty Munro Memorial Trophy: Edmonton Oil Kings (1)
- Season MVP: Brendan Shinnimin (Tri-City Americans)
- Top scorer: Brendan Shinnimin (Tri-City Americans)

Playoffs
- Playoffs MVP: Laurent Brossoit (Oil Kings)
- Finals champions: Edmonton Oil Kings (1)
- Runners-up: Portland Winterhawks

WHL seasons
- 2010–11 2012–13

2011–12 CHL season
- League: Canadian Hockey League
- Sport: Ice hockey
- Duration: OHL; September 2011 – March 2012; QMJHL; September 2011 – March 2012; WHL; September 2011 – March 2012
- Teams: 60
- TV partner(s): RDS, Rogers Sportsnet, Rogers TV, Shaw TV
- Season MVP: Brendan Shinnimin (Tri-City Americans) (WHL)
- Top scorer: Brendan Shinnimin (Tri-City Americans) (WHL)

Memorial Cup
- Finals champions: Shawinigan Cataractes (QMJHL) (1st title)
- Runners-up: London Knights (OHL)

The 2011–12 WHL season was the 46th season of the Western Hockey League (WHL). The regular season began in September 2011 and ended in March 2012. The playoffs began on March 22 and ended in early May when the regular season-champion Edmonton Oil Kings won their first Ed Chynoweth Cup, defeating the Portland Winterhawks in the championship series and earning a berth in the 2012 Memorial Cup tournament. This was the inaugural season of the Victoria Royals—the team relocated to Victoria, British Columbia from Chilliwack, where they had played as the Chilliwack Bruins from 2006 until 2011.

== Regular season ==
=== Standings ===
Map of WHL, 2011–12 to 2018–19
East Division
Central Division
BC Division
US Division

==== Conference standings ====
Western Conference
Pos	Team	Pld	W	L	OTL	SOL	GF	GA	Pts
1	x, z – Tri-City Americans	72	50	18	2	2	281	190	104
2	x, z – Kamloops Blazers	72	47	20	2	3	290	211	99
3	x – Portland Winterhawks	72	49	19	3	1	328	229	102
4	x – Vancouver Giants	72	40	26	2	4	255	234	86
5	x – Spokane Chiefs	72	38	25	5	4	257	225	85
6	x – Kelowna Rockets	72	31	31	4	6	217	242	72
7	x – Victoria Royals	72	24	41	3	4	233	325	55
8	x – Everett Silvertips	72	22	40	2	8	185	268	54
9	e – Seattle Thunderbirds	72	25	45	1	1	173	292	52
10	e – Prince George Cougars	72	24	46	0	2	166	257	50

e – eliminated from playoff contention; x – clinched playoff spot; z – clinched division

Eastern Conference
Pos	Team	Pld	W	L	OTL	SOL	GF	GA	Pts
1	x, z – Edmonton Oil Kings	72	50	15	3	4	310	193	107
2	x, z – Moose Jaw Warriors	72	45	19	6	2	258	213	98
3	x – Calgary Hitmen	72	44	25	2	1	273	221	91
4	x – Medicine Hat Tigers	72	42	24	2	4	255	209	90
5	x – Saskatoon Blades	72	40	29	1	2	268	250	83
6	x – Brandon Wheat Kings	72	39	28	1	4	273	257	83
7	x – Regina Pats	72	37	27	6	2	230	214	82
8	x – Kootenay Ice	72	36	26	6	4	222	201	82
9	e – Red Deer Rebels	72	32	34	1	5	204	231	70
10	e – Swift Current Broncos	72	27	37	2	6	216	272	62
11	e – Lethbridge Hurricanes	72	29	42	0	1	225	292	59
12	e – Prince Albert Raiders	72	21	45	3	3	219	312	48

e – eliminated from playoff contention; x – clinched playoff spot; z – clinched division

=== Statistical leaders ===
==== Scoring leaders ====
Players are listed by points, then goals.

Note: GP = Games played; G = Goals; A = Assists; Pts. = Points; PIM = Penalty minutes

Player	Team	GP	G	A	Pts.	PIM
Brendan Shinnimin	Tri-City Americans	69	58	76	134	82
Mark Stone	Brandon Wheat Kings	66	41	82	123	22
Ty Rattie	Portland Winterhawks	69	57	64	121	54
Adam Hughesman	Tri-City Americans	72	50	66	116	42
Jordan Weal	Regina Pats	70	41	75	116	36
Patrick Holland	Tri-City Americans	72	25	84	109	48
Emerson Etem	Medicine Hat Tigers	65	61	46	107	34
Michael St. Croix	Edmonton Oil Kings	72	45	60	105	49
Micheal Ferland	Brandon Wheat Kings	68	47	49	96	84
Sven Bärtschi	Portland Winterhawks	47	33	61	94	36

==== Leading goaltenders ====
These are the goaltenders that lead the league in GAA that played at least 1440 minutes.

Note: GP = Games played; Mins = Minutes played; W = Wins; L = Losses; OTL = Overtime losses; SOL = Shootout losses; SO = Shutouts; GAA = Goals against average; Sv% = Save percentage

Player	Team	GP	Mins	W	L	OTL	SOL	SO	GAA	Sv%
Ty Rimmer	Tri-City Americans	46	2665	31	12	1	1	5	2.43	.922
Laurent Brossoit	Edmonton Oil Kings	61	3574	42	13	2	3	3	2.47	.914
Nathan Lieuwen	Kootenay Ice	57	3340	27	20	6	2	3	2.50	.914
Luke Siemens	Everett/Moose Jaw	56	3202	35	14	4	2	4	2.55	.908
Tyler Bunz	Medicine Hat Tigers	61	3616	39	17	2	3	3	2.57	.921

== Players ==
=== 2011 NHL entry draft ===
In total, 33 WHL players were selected at the 2011 NHL entry draft. Ryan Nugent-Hopkins was selected first overall in the draft.

1st Round
#	Nat.	Player	WHL team	NHL team
1	(Canada)	Ryan Nugent-Hopkins	Red Deer Rebels	Edmonton Oilers
11	(Canada)	Duncan Siemens	Saskatoon Blades	Colorado Avalanche
13	(Switzerland)	Sven Bartschi	Portland Winterhawks	Calgary Flames
18	(Canada)	Mark McNeill	Prince Albert Raiders	Chicago Blackhawks
23	(Canada)	Joe Morrow	Portland Winterhawks	Pittsburgh Penguins

2nd Round
#	Nat.	Player	WHL team	NHL team
31	(Czech Republic)	David Musil	Vancouver Giants	Edmonton Oilers
32	(Canada)	Ty Rattie	Portland Winterhawks	St. Louis Blues
46	(Canada)	Joel Edmundson	Moose Jaw Warriors	St. Louis Blues
57	(Canada)	Tyler Wotherspoon	Portland Winterhawks	Calgary Flames

3rd Round
#	Nat.	Player	WHL team	NHL team
67	(Canada)	Adam Lowry	Swift Current Broncos	Winnipeg Jets
73	(United States)	Keegan Lowe	Edmonton Oil Kings	Carolina Hurricanes
74	(Canada)	Travis Ewanyk	Edmonton Oil Kings	Edmonton Oilers
84	(Canada)	Harrison Ruopp	Prince Albert Raiders	Phoenix Coyotes

4th Round
#	Nat.	Player	WHL team	NHL team
106	(Canada)	Michael St. Croix	Edmonton Oil Kings	New York Rangers
107	(United States)	Colin Jacobs	Seattle Thunderbirds	Buffalo Sabres
111	(Canada)	Kale Kessy	Medicine Hat Tigers	Phoenix Coyotes
115	(Slovakia)	Marek Tvrdon	Vancouver Giants	Detroit Red Wings
118	(Germany)	Marcel Noebels	Seattle Thunderbirds	Philadelphia Flyers
119	(Canada)	Zachary Yuen	Tri-City Americans	Winnipeg Jets

5th Round
#	Nat.	Player	WHL team	NHL team
125	(Sweden)	John Persson	Red Deer Rebels	New York Islanders
127	(Canada)	Brenden Kichton	Spokane Chiefs	New York Islanders
134	(United States)	Shane McColgan	Kelowna Rockets	New York Rangers
138	(Canada)	Darren Dietz	Saskatoon Blades	Montreal Canadiens
141	(Canada)	Darian Dziurzynski	Saskatoon Blades	Phoenix Coyotes
144	(Czech Republic)	Dominik Uher	Spokane Chiefs	Pittsburgh Penguins

6th Round
#	Nat.	Player	WHL team	NHL team
156	(Canada)	Darren Kramer	Spokane Chiefs	Ottawa Senators
159	(Canada)	Reece Scarlett	Swift Current Broncos	New Jersey Devils
164	(Canada)	Laurent Brossoit	Edmonton Oil Kings	Calgary Flames
165	(Czech Republic)	Matej Stransky	Saskatoon Blades	Dallas Stars
167	(Canada)	Nathan Lieuwen	Kootenay Ice	Buffalo Sabres
175	(Czech Republic)	Richard Nedomlel	Swift Current Broncos	Detroit Red Wings

7th Round
#	Nat.	Player	WHL team	NHL team
186	(Canada)	Jordan Fransoo	Brandon Wheat Kings	Ottawa Senators
193	(Canada)	Brody Sutter	Lethbridge Hurricanes	Carolina Hurricanes

== Subway Super Series ==
The Subway Super Series was a six-game series featuring four teams: three from the Canadian Hockey League (CHL)—one team from each of the QMJHL, the OHL, and the WHL—versus Russia's national junior hockey team.

=== Results ===
Date	Location	Winner		Loser	
November 7, 2011	Victoriaville, QC	Russian Selects	2	0	QMJHL all-stars
November 9, 2011	Quebec City, QC	Russian Selects	5	4	QMJHL all-stars
November 10, 2011	Ottawa, ON	OHL all-stars	10	7	Russian Selects
November 14, 2011	Sault Ste. Marie, ON	OHL all-stars	6	3	Russian Selects
November 16, 2011	Regina, SK	WHL all-stars	5	2	Russian Selects
November 17, 2011	Moose Jaw, SK	Russian Selects	7	5	WHL all-stars
CHL wins series 3–2–1

== 2012 WHL Playoffs ==
Conference Quarterfinals	Conference Semifinals
1	Edmonton	4
8	Kootenay	0
1	Edmonton	4
6	Brandon	0
2	Moose Jaw	4
7	Regina	1
Eastern
3	Calgary	1
6	Brandon	4
2	Moose Jaw	4
4	Medicine Hat	0
4	Medicine Hat	4
5	Saskatoon	0
Note: Pairings are re-seeded after the first round.
1	Tri-City	4
8	Everett	0
1	Tri-City	4
5	Spokane	3
2	Kamloops	4
7	Victoria	0
Western
3	Portland	4
6	Kelowna	0
2	Kamloops	3
3	Portland	4
4	Vancouver	2
5	Spokane	4

Conference Finals
1	Edmonton	4
2	Moose Jaw	1
1	Tri-City	0
3	Portland	4

WHL Championship
E1	Edmonton	4
W3	Portland	3

== Conference Quarter-finals ==
=== Eastern Conference ===
==== (1) Edmonton Oil Kings vs. (8) Kootenay Ice ====
March 23	Edmonton Oil Kings	3 – 0	Kootenay Ice	Rexall Place	Recap
19:54 - Mitch Moroz (1)		First period	No scoring
No scoring		Second period	No scoring
7:07 - Michael St. Croix (1); 16:41 - Curtis Lazar (1)		Third period	No scoring
Laurent Brossoit (29 saves / 29 shots)		Goalie stats	Nathan Lieuwen (25 saves / 28 shots)

March 25	Edmonton Oil Kings	4 – 3	Kootenay Ice	Rexall Place	Recap
8:46 - pp - Michael St. Croix (2)		First period	Drew Czerwonka (1) - 1:00; Jesse Ismond (1) - 16:47
2:37 - pp - Tyler Maxwell (1)		Second period	Joey Leach (1) - 12:49
15:05 - Curtis Lazar (2); 16:48 - Keegan Lowe (1)		Third period	No scoring
Laurent Brossoit (22 saves / 25 shots)		Goalie stats	Nathan Lieuwen (41 saves / 45 shots)

March 28	Kootenay Ice	3 – 6	Edmonton Oil Kings	Cranbrook Recreational Complex	Recap
3:12 - Elgin Pearce (1); 9:31 - Sam Reinhart (1)		First period	Curtis Lazar (3) - pp - 9:03
15:14 - Dylen McKinlay (1)		Second period	No scoring
No scoring		Third period	Griffin Reinhart (1) - 1:57; Keegan Lowe (2) - 8:14; Kristiāns Pelšs (1) - 12:44; Mitch Moroz (2) - 13:01; Henrik Samuelsson (1) - en - 19:45
Nathan Lieuwen (31 saves / 36 shots)		Goalie stats	Laurent Brossoit (23 saves / 26 shots)

March 29	Kootenay Ice	1 – 3	Edmonton Oil Kings	Cranbrook Recreational Complex	Recap
No scoring		First period	Mark Pysyk (1) - pp - 4:22
10:21 - pp - Drew Czerwonka (2)		Second period	Rhett Rachinski (1) - 14:09
No scoring		Third period	Rhett Rachinski (2) - en - 19:23
Nathan Lieuwen (24 saves / 26 shots)		Goalie stats	Laurent Brossoit (14 saves / 15 shots)

Edmonton wins series 4 – 0

==== (2) Moose Jaw Warriors vs. (7) Regina Pats ====
March 23	Moose Jaw Warriors	2 – 3	Regina Pats	Mosaic Place	Recap
19:35 - pp - Quinton Howden (1)		First period	Dyson Stevenson (1) - pp - 5:51
17:14 - Sam Fioretti (1)		Second period	Tanner Olstad (1) - sh - 4:12
No scoring		Third period	Dyson Stevenson (2) - pp - 6:52
Luke Siemens (12 saves / 15 shots)		Goalie stats	Matt Hewitt (31 saves / 33 shots)

March 24	Moose Jaw Warriors	8 – 1	Regina Pats	Mosaic Place	Recap
15:58 - Cody Beach (1)		First period	No scoring
1:59 - pp - Kenton Miller (1); 5:27 - Cody Beach (2); 8:48 - Eric Arnold (1)		Second period	No scoring
1:39 - Andrew Johnson (1); 10:14 - pp - Cameron Braes (1); 10:23 - Sam Fioretti (2); 10:55 - Eric Arnold (2)		Third period	Dyson Stevenson (3) - 5:32
Luke Siemens (12 saves / 13 shots)		Goalie stats	Matt Hewitt (19 saves / 23 shots); Adam Beukeboom (12 saves / 16 shots)

March 27	Regina Pats	3 – 5	Moose Jaw Warriors	Brandt Centre	Recap
18:53 - Chandler Stephenson (1)		First period	Joel Edmundson (1) - 0:23; Quinton Howden (2) - 0:50; Kenton Miller (2) - pp - 13:31; Brayden Point (1) - 15:14; Quinton Howden (3) - 17:24
No scoring		Second period	No scoring
10:37 - Lane Scheidl (1); 19:18 - Lane Scheidl (2)		Third period	No scoring
Matt Hewitt (25 saves / 30 shots)		Goalie stats	Luke Siemens (33 saves / 36 shots)

March 28	Regina Pats	4 – 5	2OT	Moose Jaw Warriors	Brandt Centre	Recap
No scoring		First period		Justin Kirsch (1) - pp - 4:35
6:54 - Jordan Weal (1); 19:30 - Kyle Burroughs (1)		Second period		James Henry (1) - 2:31; Eric Arnold (3) - pp - 18:43
5:48 - Martin Marinčin (1); 7:20 - Martin Marinčin (2)		Third period		Eric Arnold (4) - pp - 15:51
No scoring		Second overtime period		Brayden Point (2) - 6:14
Matt Hewitt (47 saves / 52 shots)		Goalie stats		Luke Siemens (30 saves / 34 shots)

March 30	Moose Jaw Warriors	5 – 2	Regina Pats	Mosaic Place	Recap
0:16 - Justin Kirsch (2); 5:21 - Brayden Point (3); 8:00 - Torrin White (1); 17:33 - pp - Cody Beach (3)		First period	No scoring
No scoring		Second period	Trent Ouellette (1) - 9:37
17:27 - James Henry (2)		Third period	Lane Scheidl (3) - 7:51
Luke Siemens (14 saves / 16 shots)		Goalie stats	Adam Beukeboom (28 saves / 33 shots)

Moose Jaw wins series 4 – 1

==== (3) Calgary Hitmen vs. (6) Brandon Wheat Kings ====
March 22	Calgary Hitmen	2 – 6	Brandon Wheat Kings	Scotiabank Saddledome	Recap
19:01 - Brooks Macek (1)		First period	Jason Swyripa (1) - 8:41; Darian Dziurzynski (1) - 9:27
1:16 - pp - Alex Gogolev (1)		Second period	Mark Stone (1) - 16:13
No scoring		Third period	Michael Ferland (1) - 6:22; Darian Dziurzynski (2) - 6:50; Alessio Bertaggia (1) - 16:15
Chris Driedger (26 saves / 32 shots)		Goalie stats	Corbin Boes (34 saves / 36 shots)

March 23	Calgary Hitmen	4 – 0	Brandon Wheat Kings	Scotiabank Saddledome	Recap
1:25 - Alex Roach (1)		First period	No scoring
19:26 - Trevor Cheek (1)		Second period	No scoring
7:54 - Trevor Cheek (2); 19:14 - pp - Trevor Cheek (3)		Third period	No scoring
Brandon Glover (20 saves / 20 shots)		Goalie stats	Corbin Boes (37 saves / 41 shots)

March 25	Brandon Wheat Kings	4 – 1	Calgary Hitmen	MTS Centre	Recap
4:32 - Bruno Mráz (1)		First period	Greg Chase (1) - 19:09
8:01 - pp - Michael Ferland (2); 19:41 - Eric Roy (1)		Second period	No scoring
4:56 - Kevin Sundher (1)		Third period	No scoring
Corbin Boes (26 saves / 27 shots)		Goalie stats	Brandon Glover (38 saves / 42 shots)

March 27	Brandon Wheat Kings	3 – 1	Calgary Hitmen	MTS Centre	Recap
10:53 - pp - Ryan Pulock (1); 15:25 - Mark Stone (2)		First period	No scoring
1:53 - Alessio Bertaggia (2)		Second period	No scoring
No scoring		Third period	Alex Gogolev (2) - 8:22
Corbin Boes (32 saves / 33 shots)		Goalie stats	Chris Driedger (13 saves / 16 shots); Brandon Glover (13 saves / 13 shots)

March 29	Brandon Wheat Kings	3 – 2	OT	Calgary Hitmen	MTS Centre	Recap
No scoring		First period		No scoring
Alessio Bertaggia (3) - 0:36		Second period		No scoring
Paul Ciarelli (1) - 4:14		Third period		1:12 - Alex Gogolev (3); 1:45 - Chase Clayton (1)
Paul Ciarelli (2) - 8:26		First overtime period		No scoring
Corbin Boes (42 saves / 44 shots)		Goalie stats		Brandon Glover (40 saves / 43 shots)

Brandon wins series 4 – 1

==== (4) Medicine Hat Tigers vs. (5) Saskatoon Blades ====
March 23	Medicine Hat Tigers	5 – 2	Saskatoon Blades	Medicine Hat Arena	Recap
No scoring		First period	No scoring
7:23 - Matt Konan (1); 11:33 - Curtis Valk (1); 14:44 - Riley Sheen (1); 15:56 - James Bettauer (1)		Second period	Josh Nicholls (1) - 10:00; Duncan Siemens (1) - 16:40
18:17 - en - Emerson Etem (1)		Third period	No scoring
Tyler Bunz (29 saves / 31 shots)		Goalie stats	Andrey Makarov (25 saves / 29 shots)

March 24	Medicine Hat Tigers	5 – 3	Saskatoon Blades	Medicine Hat Arena	Recap
0:56 - pp - Emerson Etem (2); 11:07 - pp - Emerson Etem (3)		First period	Matt Pufahl (1) - 13:19
16:28 - James Bettauer (2)		Second period	Brett Stovin (1) - 2:52; Josh Nicholls (2) - 6:55
14:32 - Hunter Shinkaruk (1); 19:54 - pp - Curtis Valk (2)		Third period	No scoring
Tyler Bunz (25 saves / 28 shots)		Goalie stats	Andrey Makarov (35 saves / 40 shots)

March 27	Saskatoon Blades	2 – 3	OT	Medicine Hat Tigers	Credit Union Centre	Recap
11:35 - Michael Burns (1)		First period		Emerson Etem (4) - 4:37
No scoring		Second period		No scoring
16:52 - Matěj Stránský (1)		Third period		Emerson Etem (5) - sh - 2:57
No scoring		First overtime period		Emerson Etem (6) - 9:42
Andrey Makarov (33 saves / 36 shots)		Goalie stats		Tyler Bunz (32 saves / 34 shots)

March 28	Saskatoon Blades	0 – 5	Medicine Hat Tigers	Credit Union Centre	Recap
No scoring		First period	No scoring
No scoring		Second period	Emerson Etem (7) - 15:46
No scoring		Third period	Scott McKay (1) - 4:35; Dylan Bredo (1) - 6:01; Curtis Valk (3) - 11:50; Curtis Valk (4) - pp - 15:12
Andrey Makarov (23 saves / 28 shots)		Goalie stats	Tyler Bunz (32 saves / 32 shots)

Medicine Hat wins series 4 – 0

=== Western Conference ===
==== (1) Tri-City Americans vs. (8) Everett Silvertips ====
March 23	Tri-City Americans	7 – 2	Everett Silvertips	Toyota Center	Recap
3:11 - pp - Jesse Mychan (1); 8:50 - Malte Strömwall (1); 9:07 - Mason Wilgosh (1); 19:18 - Connor Rankin (1)		First period	Ryan Murray (1) - 10:47
8:04 - Adam Hughesman (1)		Second period	J.T. Barnett (1) - 17:53
13:23 - Malte Strömwall (2); 17:46 - Brian Williams (1)		Third period	No scoring
Ty Rimmer (14 saves / 16 shots)		Goalie stats	Kent Simpson (18 saves / 23 shots); Austin Lotz (17 saves / 19 shots)

March 24	Tri-City Americans	3 – 1	Everett Silvertips	Toyota Center	Recap
10:21 - pp - Patrick Holland (1); 12:50 - pp - Mason Wilgosh (2)		First period	No scoring
6:20 - pp - Adam Hughesman (2)		Second period	No scoring
No scoring		Third period	Ryan Murray (2) - 18:57
Ty Rimmer (17 saves / 18 shots)		Goalie stats	Kent Simpson (33 saves / 36 shots)

March 27	Everett Silvertips	0 – 4	Tri-City Americans	Comcast Arena at Everett	Recap
No scoring		First period	No scoring
No scoring		Second period	Brendan Shinnimin (1) - 1:41; Brendan Shinnimin (2) - 3:21
No scoring		Third period	Adam Hughesman (3) - en - 18:14; Justin Feser (1) - 18:51
Kent Simpson (27 saves / 30 shots)		Goalie stats	Ty Rimmer (23 saves / 23 shots)

March 28	Everett Silvertips	3 – 4	OT	Tri-City Americans	Comcast Arena at Everett	Recap
No scoring		First period		Brendan Shinnimin (3) - 6:05
No scoring		Second period		Mason Wilgosh (3) - pp - 0:31; Mitch Topping (1) - 9:58
6:10 - pp - Ryan Harrison (1); 9:10 - sh - Ryan Murray (3); 19:19 - pp - Josh Caron (1)		Third period		No scoring
No scoring		First overtime period		Zach Yuen (1) - 18:53
Kent Simpson (35 saves / 39 shots)		Goalie stats		Ty Rimmer (42 saves / 45 shots)

Tri-City wins series 4 – 0

==== (2) Kamloops Blazers vs. (7) Victoria Royals ====
March 23	Kamloops Blazers	4 – 1	Victoria Royals	Interior Savings Centre	Recap
9:29 - Dylan Willick (1)		First period	Robin Soudek (1) - pp - 11:36
4:13 - Tim Bozon (1); 17:03 - Chase Schaber (1); 17:50 - Tim Bozon (2)		Second period	No scoring
No scoring		Third period	No scoring
Cole Cheveldave (26 saves / 27 shots)		Goalie stats	Keith Hamilton (30 saves / 34 shots)

March 24	Kamloops Blazers	7 – 4	Victoria Royals	Interior Savings Centre	Recap
19:24 - ps - Jordan DePape (1)		First period	Jamie Crooks (1) - 2:54
0:38 - Tim Bozon (3); 8:15 - pp - Brady Gaudet (1); 9:03 - Chase Schaber (2); 11:27 - Dylan Willick (2); 14:57 - Cole Ully (1)		Second period	No scoring
16:37 - pp - Jordan DePape (2)		Third period	Austin Carroll (1) - 3:07; Robin Soudek (2) - 14:15; Taylor Crunk (1) - 18:14
Cole Cheveldave (24 saves / 28 shots)		Goalie stats	Keith Hamilton (25 saves / 29 shots); Jared Rathjen (21 saves / 24 shots)

March 27	Victoria Royals	5 – 7	Kamloops Blazers	Save-On-Foods Memorial Centre	Recap
8:02 - Zane Jones (1); 15:16 - Jamie Crooks (2)		First period	No scoring
5:51 - Jamie Crooks (3); 8:26 - Jamie Crooks (4)		Second period	Dylan Willick (3) - sh - 0:54; Tim Bozon (4) - 2:55; Landon Cross (1) - pp - 4:36; Jordan DePape (3) - pp - 14:55; Matt Needham (1) - sh - 17:26; JC Lipon (1) - 18:48
1:20 - Austin Carroll (2)		Third period	Colin Smith (1) - 6:38
Jared Rathjen (16 saves / 21 shots); Keith Hamilton (10 saves / 12 shots)		Goalie stats	Cole Cheveldave (18 saves / 23 shots)

March 28	Victoria Royals	1 – 4	Kamloops Blazers	Save-On-Foods Memorial Centre	Recap
1:40 - Ben Walker (1)		First period	Matt Needham (2) - 12:13
No scoring		Second period	Brendan Ranford (1) - 4:27; Dylan Willick (4) - 13:07
No scoring		Third period	Dylan Willick (5) - en - 18:47
Keith Hamilton (21 saves / 24 shots		Goalie stats	Cole Cheveldave (30 saves / 31 shots)

Kamloops wins series 4 – 0

==== (3) Portland Winterhawks vs. (6) Kelowna Rockets ====
March 23	Portland Winterhawks	6 – 3	Kelowna Rockets	Veterans Memorial Coliseum	Recap
No scoring		First period	Cody Chikie (1) - pp - 17:23
7:42 - Ty Rattie (1); 11:42 - pp - Ty Rattie (2); 19:59 - Joe Morrow (1)		Second period	Zach Franko (1) - 17:08
3:43 - Oliver Gabriel (1); 10:53 - Taylor Leier (1); 17:31 - Ty Rattie (3)		Third period	Colton Sissons (1) - 8:06
Mac Carruth (26 saves / 29 shots)		Goalie stats	Adam Brown (49 saves / 55 shots)

March 24	Portland Winterhawks	4 – 0	Kelowna Rockets	Veterans Memorial Coliseum	Recap
No scoring		First period	No scoring
7:30 - pp - Troy Rutkowski (1); 18:53 - sh - Brad Ross (1)		Second period	No scoring
2:07 - pp - Ty Rattie (4); 9:46 - Tyler Wotherspoon (1)		Third period	No scoring
Mac Carruth (20 saves / 20 shots)		Goalie stats	Adam Brown (35 saves / 39 shots)

March 27	Kelowna Rockets	3 – 6	Portland Winterhawks	Prospera Place	Recap
10:46 - pp - Damon Severson (1)		First period	Ty Rattie (5) - 5:56; Sven Bärtschi (1) - 13:48
6:06 - Cole Martin (1)		Second period	Ty Rattie (6) - 19:19
18:52 - Damon Severson (2)		Third period	Sven Bärtschi (2) - 3:55; Joe Morrow (2) - en - 19:30; Taylor Leier (2) - en - 19:59
Adam Brown (40 saves / 44 shots)		Goalie stats	Mac Carruth (38 saves / 41 shots)

March 29	Kelowna Rockets	3 – 5	Portland Winterhawks	Prospera Place	Recap
17:34 - Madison Bowey (1)		First period	Ty Rattie (7) - 4:06; Ty Rattie (8) - 19:08
2:27 - pp - Brett Bulmer (1)		Second period	No scoring
7:33 - Myles Bell (1)		Third period	Ty Rattie (9) - 1:28; Taylor Leier (3) - 13:05; Ty Rattie (10) - en - 19:25
Adam Brown (30 saves / 34 shots)		Goalie stats	Mac Carruth (29 saves / 32 shots)

Portland wins series 4 – 0

==== (4) Vancouver Giants vs. (5) Spokane Chiefs ====
March 23	Vancouver Giants	7 – 5	Spokane Chiefs	Pacific Coliseum	Recap
19:57 - Austin Fyten (1)		First period	No scoring
1:44 - Cain Franson (1); 3:30 - Marek Tvrdoň (1); 7:23 - pp - Jordan Martinook (1); 16:34 - Jordan Martinook (2)		Second period	Blake Gal (1) - sh - 6:42; Steven Kuhn (1) - 15:26
16:12 - Cain Franson (2); 19:58 - en - Cain Franso (3)		Third period	Jason Fram (1) - pp - 6:32; Dominik Uher (1) - sh - 7:37; Mike Aviani (1) - 18:29
Adam Morrison (19 saves / 24 shots)		Goalie stats	Mac Engel (33 saves / 39 shots)

March 24	Vancouver Giants	7 – 3	Spokane Chiefs	Pacific Coliseum	Recap
8:10 - Neil Manning (1); 10:20 - Jordan Martinook (3)		First period	No scoring
9:53 - Marek Tvrdoň (2); 11:32 - pp - Brendan Gallagher (1); 16:29 - Marek Tvrdoň (3)		Second period	No scoring
8:07 - Neil Manning (2); 14:40 - Brendan Gallagher (2)		Third period	Steven Kuhn (2) - pp - 1:03; Mitch Holmberg (1) - 3:05; Mitch Holmberg (2) - 10:54
Adam Morrison (38 saves / 41 shots)		Goalie stats	Mac Engel (12 saves / 17 shots); Eric Williams (10 saves / 12 shots)

March 27	Spokane Chiefs	3 – 2	Vancouver Giants	Spokane Veterans Memorial Arena	Recap
3:48 - Reid Gow (1); 16:57 - Blake Gal (2)		First period	No scoring
No scoring		Second period	Cain Franson (4) - 3:48
15:56 - Corbin Baldwin (1)		Third period	Brendan Gallagher (3) - 17:30
Eric Williams (26 saves / 28 shots)		Goalie stats	Adam Morrison (25 saves / 28 shots)

March 28	Spokane Chiefs	3 – 2	OT	Vancouver Giants	Spokane Veterans Memorial Arena	Recap
8:26 - Darren Kramer (1)		First period		No scoring
9:33 - Ryan Hofer (1)		Second period		No scoring
No scoring		Third period		Austin Fyten (2) - 9:21; Brendan Gallagher (4) - 19:21
6:43 - Mitch Holmberg (3)		First overtime period		No scoring
Eric Williams (21 saves / 23 shots)		Goalie stats		Adam Morrison (23 saves / 26 shots)

March 30	Vancouver Giants	1 – 5	Spokane Chiefs	Pacific Coliseum	Recap
No scoring		First period	Ryan Hofer (2) - 7:20
15:06 - pp - Brendan Gallagher (5)		Second period	Darren Kramer (2) - 1:09
No scoring		Third period	Mitch Holmberg (4) - 4:47; Mitch Holmberg (5) - pp - 9:17; Blake Gal (3) - 9:37
Adam Morrison (19 saves / 24 shots)		Goalie stats	Eric Williams (23 saves / 24 shots)

April 1	Spokane Chiefs	3 – 1	Vancouver Giants	Spokane Veterans Memorial Arena	Recap
15:17 - Mike Aviani (2)		First period	Cain Franson (5) - 1:40
19:57 - Corbin Baldwin (2)		Second period	No scoring
6:26 - Mitch Holmberg (6)		Third period	No scoring
Eric Williams (26 saves / 27 shots)		Goalie stats	Adam Morrison (29 saves / 32 shots)

Spokane wins series 4 – 2

== Conference Semi-finals ==
=== Eastern Conference ===
==== (1) Edmonton Oil Kings vs. (6) Brandon Wheat Kings ====
April 6	Edmonton Oil Kings	2 – 1	Brandon Wheat Kings	Rexall Place	Recap
9:08 - Kristiāns Pelšs (2)		First period	No scoring
3:45 - pp - Dylan Wruck (1)		Second period	No scoring
No scoring		Third period	Brodie Melnychuk (1) - 8:23
Laurent Brossoit (28 saves / 29 shots)		Goalie stats	Corbin Boes (45 saves / 47 shots)

April 7	Edmonton Oil Kings	4 – 3	Brandon Wheat Kings	Rexall Place	Recap
No scoring		First period	Michael Ferland (3) - 0:39
5:56 - Kristiāns Pelšs (3); 8:28 - Kristiāns Pelšs (4); 9:54 - Travis Ewanyk (1); 10:55 - Jordan Peddle (1)		Second period	Alessio Bertaggia 4) - 6:26; Ryan Pulock (2) - 19:59
No scoring		Third period	No scoring
Laurent Brossoit (26 saves / 29 shots)		Goalie stats	Corbin Boes (31 saves / 35 shots)

April 10	Brandon Wheat Kings	1 – 5	Edmonton Oil Kings	Westman Place	Recap
10:48 - pp - Ryan Pulock (3)		First period	No scoring
No scoring		Second period	Travis Ewanyk (2) - 5:24; Curtis Lazar (4) - 14:21
		Third period	T.J. Foster (1) - pp - 0:46; Mitchell Moroz (3) - pp - 6:10; Stephane Legault (1) - 14:53
Corbin Boes (37 saves / 42 shots)		Goalie stats	Laurent Brossoit (25 saves / 26 shots)

April 11	Brandon Wheat Kings	0 – 6	Edmonton Oil Kings	Westman Place	Recap
No scoring		First period	Henrik Samuelsson (2) - 2:50; Mark Pysyk (2) - sh - 9:00; Travis Ewanyk (3) - 11:48; Martin Gernát (1) - 14:51
No scoring		Second period	Martin Gernát (2) - 3:19
No scoring		Third period	Michael St. Croix (3) - 17:13
Corbin Boes (11 saves / 15 shots); Brandon Anderson (29 saves / 31 shots)		Goalie stats	Laurent Brossoit (24 saves / 24 shots)

Edmonton wins series 4 – 0

==== (2) Moose Jaw Warriors vs. (4) Medicine Hat Tigers ====
April 6	Moose Jaw Warriors	2 – 1	Medicine Hat Tigers	Mosaic Place	Recap
No scoring		First period	No scoring
8:11 - Joel Edmundson (2)		Second period	No scoring
11:41 - Joel Edmundson (3)		Third period	Curtis Valk (5) - pp - 19:06
Luke Siemens (16 saves / 17 shots)		Goalie stats	Tyler Bunz (41 saves / 43 shots)

April 7	Moose Jaw Warriors	6 – 1	Medicine Hat Tigers	Mosaic Place	Recap
No scoring		First period	Hunter Shinkaruk (2) - sh - 18:02
9:50 - Quinton Howden (4); 10:35 - Quinton Howden (5)		Second period	No scoring
0:13 - Eric Arnold (5); 5:19 - Kenton Miller (3); 14:07 - pp - Justin Kirsch (3); 17:06 - Cody Beach (4)		Third period	No scoring
Luke Siemens (14 saves / 15 shots)		Goalie stats	Tyler Bunz (34 saves / 40 shots)

April 10	Medicine Hat Tigers	2 – 4	Moose Jaw Warriors	Medicine Hat Arena	Recap
8:15 - Curtis Valk (6)		First period	No scoring
No scoring		Second period	Brayden Point (4) - 1:49; Kendall McFaull (1) - 12:40
18:02 - Matt Konan (2)		Third period	Eric Arnold (6) - 10:41; James Henry (3) - 13:42
Tyler Bunz (48 saves / 52 shots)		Goalie stats	Luke Siemens (24 saves / 26 shots)

April 11	Medicine Hat Tigers	3 – 4	OT	Moose Jaw Warriors	Medicine Hat Arena	Recap
9:09 - pp - James Bettauer (3); 16:58 - pp - Boston Leier (1); 17:43 - pp - James Bettauer (4)		First period		James Henry (4) - 1:43
No scoring		Second period		Kenton Miller (4) - pp - 3:08
No scoring		Third period		Sam Fioretti (3) - 15:51
No scoring		First overtime period		Brayden Point (5) - pp - 8:50
Tyler Bunz (43 saves / 47 shots)		Goalie stats		Luke Siemens (28 saves / 31 shots)

Moose Jaw wins series 4 – 0

=== Western Conference ===
==== (1) Tri-City Americans vs. (5) Spokane Chiefs ====
April 6	Tri-City Americans	2 – 3	OT	Spokane Chiefs	Toyota Center	Recap
8:05 - pp - Brendan Shinnimin (4)		First period		No scoring
No scoring		Second period		Mike Aviani (3) - 16:22
14:34 - Mason Wilgosh (4)		Third period		Darren Kramer (3) - 2:39
No scoring		First overtime period		Mitch Holmberg (7) - 14:34
Ty Rimmer (35 saves / 38 shots)		Goalie stats		Eric Williams (30 saves / 32 shots)

April 7	Tri-City Americans	2 – 1	Spokane Chiefs	Toyota Center	Recap
13:21 - Adam Hughesman (4)		First period	No scoring
No scoring		Second period	No scoring
4:01 - Justin Feser (2)		Third period	Mitch Holmberg (8) - pp - 18:35
Ty Rimmer (23 saves / 24 shots)		Goalie stats	Eric Williams (31 saves / 33 shots)

April 11	Spokane Chiefs	1 – 2	Tri-City Americans	Spokane Veterans Memorial Arena	Recap
No scoring		First period	Nathan MacMaster (1) - 9:20; Brendan Shinnimin (5) - 14:56
No scoring		Second period	No scoring
12:16 - Steven Kuhn (3)		Third period	No scoring
Eric Williams (27 saves / 29 shots)		Goalie stats	Ty Rimmer (24 saves / 25 shots)

April 13	Spokane Chiefs	3 – 2	OT	Tri-City Americans	Spokane Veterans Memorial Arena	Recap
3:42 - Collin Valcourt (1); 11:43 - pp - Mitch Holmberg (9)		First period		No scoring
No scoring		Second period		Derek Ryckman (1) - 3:00; Adam Hughesman (5) - pp - 12:32
No scoring		Third period		No scoring
6:28 - Dominik Uher (2)		First overtime period		No scoring
Eric Williams (33 saves / 35 shots)		Goalie stats		Ty Rimmer (34 saves / 37 shots)

April 14	Tri-City Americans	5 – 3	Spokane Chiefs	Toyota Center	Recap
13:33 - Patrick Holland (2)		First period	Steven Kuhn (4) - 4:04
7:37 - pp - Adam Hughesman (6); 11:08 - sh - Dominik Uher (3)		Second period	Reid Gow (2) - 0:41
11:53 - Mitch Topping (2); 16:44 - Justin Hamonic; 19:00 - en - Connor Rankin (2)		Third period	No scoring
Ty Rimmer (21 saves / 24 shots)		Goalie stats	Eric Williams (28 saves / 32 shots)

April 16	Spokane Chiefs	4 – 3	OT	Tri-City Americans	Spokane Veterans Memorial Arena	Recap
5:35 - pp - Dominik Uher (4); 6:28 - Mitch Holmberg (10)		First period		Derek Ryckman (2) - 2:56
9:20 - pp - Steven Kuhn (5)		Second period		Justin Feser (3) - sh - 8:47; Patrick Holland (3) - 18:31
No scoring		Third period		No scoring
9:33 - Ryan Hofer (3)		First overtime period		No scoring
Eric Williams (27 saves / 30 shots)		Goalie stats		Ty Rimmer (20 saves / 24 shots)

April 18	Tri-City Americans	3 – 2	Spokane Chiefs	Toyota Center	Recap
No scoring		First period	Dominik Uher (5) - pp - 18:48
5:03 - Brian Williams (2)		Second period	No scoring
14:38 - pp - Malte Strömwall (3); 15:42 - Brendan Shinnimin (6)		Third period	Mitch Holmberg (11) - 5:47
Ty Rimmer (17 saves / 19 shots)		Goalie stats	Eric Williams (45 saves / 48 shots)

Tri-City wins series 4 – 3

==== (2) Kamloops Blazers vs. (3) Portland Winterhawks ====
April 6	Portland Winterhawks	5 – 3	Kamloops Blazers	Veterans Memorial Coliseum	Recap
No scoring		First period	0:24 - Matt Needham (3); 7:56 - Jordan DePape (4)
Ty Rattie (11) - 5:19		Second period	9:11 - Chase Souto (1)
Sven Bärtschi (3) - 9:02; Ty Rattie (12) - 10:09; Brad Ross (2) - pp - 14:47; Brad Ross (3) - sh - en - 19:31		Third period	No scoring
Mac Carruth (26 saves / 29 shots)		Goalie stats	Cole Cheveldae (41 saves / 45 shots)

April 7	Portland Winterhawks	4 – 1	Kamloops Blazers	Veterans Memorial Coliseum	Recap
No scoring		First period	No scoring
Sven Bärtschi (4) - 19:14		Second period	No scoring
Taylor Leier (4) - 0:56; Cam Reid (1) - 1:15; Sven Bärtschi (5) - pp - 7:12		Third period	1:54 - Chase Souto (2)
Mac Carruth (39 saves / 40 shots)		Goalie stats	Cam Lanigan (30 saves / 34 shots)

April 10	Kamloops Blazers	2 – 5	Portland Winterhawks	Interior Savings Centre	Recap
Brendan Ranford (2) - 15:53		First period	3:11 - Brad Ross (4)
Colin Smith (2) - pp - 16:11		Second period	5:16 - sh - Taylor Leier (5); 5:49 - sh - Brad Ross (5); 16:59 - Brad Ross (6)
No scoring		Third period	19:23 - sh - en - Brad Ross (7)
Cam Lanigan (24 saves / 28 shots)		Goalie stats	Mac Carruth (38 saves / 40 shots)

April 11	Kamloops Blazers	5 – 4	Portland Winterhawks	Interior Savings Centre	Recap
No scoring		First period	4:19 - Ty Rattie (13); 5:21 - Derrick Pouliot (1); 8:22 - Cam Reid (2); 10:58 - Derrick Pouliot (2)
Bronson Maschmeyer (1) - pp - 15:06; Brandon Herrod (1) - 18:30		Second period	No scoring
Brendan Ranford (3) - 6:03; Dylan Willick (6) - pp - 7:37		Third period	No scoring
Cam Lanigan (27 saves / 31 shots)		Goalie stats	Mac Carruth (29 saves / 34 shots)

April 14^	Portland Winterhawks	2 – 7	Kamloops Blazers	Veterans Memorial Coliseum	Recap
No scoring		First period	8:53 - Marek Hrbas (1); 16:46 - Jordan DePape (5)
Brendan Leipsic (1) - 8:42		Second period	5:30 - Ryan Hanes (1); 19:18 - pp - Brendan Ranford (4)
Marcel Noebels (1) - 11:23		Third period	6:30 - ps - Tim Bozon (5); 7:37 - Chase Souto (3); 10:51 - Jordan DePape (6)
Mac Carruth (26 saves / 32 shots); Brendan Burke (1 save / 2 shots)		Goalie stats	Cam Lanigan (34 saves / 36 shots)

April 16	Kamloops Blazers	7 – 6	Portland Winterhawks	Interior Savings Centre	Recap
Brendan Ranford (5) - 7:15; Bronson Maschmeyer (2) - 14:13		First period	6:46 - Derrick Pouliot (3); 8:06 - pp - Brad Ross (8); 17:32 - pp - Brad Ross (9)
No scoring		Second period	6:43 - Oliver Gabriel (2); 11:24 - pp - Brendan Leipsic (2)
Marek Hrbas (2) - pp - 5:55; Jordan DePape (7) - 8:49; Aspen Sterzer (1) - 9:00; Collin Smith (3) - pp - 15:21; Bronson Maschmeyer (3) - 19:39		Third period	15:47 - Cam Reid (3)
Cam Lanigan (24 saves / 30 shots)		Goalie stats	Mac Carruth (36 saves / 43 shots)

April 18	Portland Winterhawks	2 – 0	Kamloops Blazers	Veterans Memorial Coliseum	Recap
No scoring		First period	No scoring
Marcel Noebels (2) - 1:01		Second period	No scoring
Brendan Leipsic (3) - 9:49		Third period	No scoring
Mac Carruth (32 saves / 32 shots)		Goalie stats	Cam Lanigan (37 saves / 39 shots)

Portland wins series 4 – 3

^ Game 5 was played at Rose Garden.

== Conference Finals ==
=== Eastern Conference ===
==== (1) Edmonton Oil Kings vs. (2) Moose Jaw Warriors ====
April 20	Edmonton Oil Kings	6 – 1	Moose Jaw Warriors	Rexall Place	Recap
9:15 - Klarc Wilson (1)		First period	No scoring
0:18 - Stephane Legault (2); 5:07 - Rhett Rachinski (3); 12:55 - Curtis Lazar (5); 18:22 - Tyler Maxwell (2)		Second period	Jordan Wyton (1) - 14:30
9:21 - pp - Stephane Legault (3)		Third period	No scoring
Laurent Brossoit (29 saves / 30 shots)		Goalie stats	Luke Siemens (19 saves / 24 shots); Spencer Tremblay (5 saves / 6 shots)

April 22	Edmonton Oil Kings	6 – 1	Moose Jaw Warriors	Rexall Place	Recap
13:19 - Jordan Peddle (2)		First period	No scoring
10:01 - Henrik Samuelsson (3); 14:35 - pp - Martin Gernát (3)		Second period	Kenton Miller (5) - pp - 11:37
6:54 - Curtis Lazar (6); 17:47 - en - Jordan Peddle (3); 18:40 - pp - Mitchell Moroz (4)		Third period	No scoring
Laurent Brossoit (48 saves / 49 shots)		Goalie stats	Luke Siemens (26 saves / 31 shots)

April 24	Moose Jaw Warriors	2 – 3	Edmonton Oil Kings	Mosaic Place	Recap
Brayden Point (6) - pp - 17:07		First period	T.J. Foster (2) - 8:05
No scoring		Second period	Curtis Lazar (7) - pp - 1:44
15:33 - James Henry (5)		Third period	Michael St. Croix (4) - 5:38
Luke Siemens (20 saves / 32 shots)		Goalie stats	Laurent Brossoit (30 saves / 32 shots)

April 25	Moose Jaw Warriors	5 – 1	Edmonton Oil Kings	Mosaic Place	Recap
5:59 - pp - Brayden Point (7); 14:47 - Cam Braes (2); 19:58 - Kenton Miller (6)		First period	No scoring
6:24 - Kenton Miller (7)		Second period	Tyler Maxwell (3) - 8:28
17:35 - en - James Henry (6)		Third period	No scoring
Justin Paulic (28 saves / 29 shots)		Goalie stats	Laurent Brossoit (29 saves / 33 shots)

April 27	Edmonton Oil Kings	4 – 1	Moose Jaw Warriors	Rexall Place	Recap
2:46 - Michael St. Croix (5); 17:44 - pp - Martin Gernát (4)		First period	No scoring
17:05 - Curtis Lazar (8)		Second period	Sam Fioretti (4) - 7:09
9:06 - pp - Martin Gernát (5)		Third period	No scoring
Laurent Brossoit (37 saves / 38 shots)		Goalie stats	Justin Paulic (20 saves / 24 shots)

Edmonton wins series 4 – 1

=== Western Conference ===
==== (1) Tri-City Americans vs. (3) Portland Winterhawks ====
April 20	Tri-City Americans	4 – 5	OT	Portland Winterhawks	Toyota Center	Recap
No scoring		First period		Brendan Leipsic (4) - 19:40
6:26 - pp - Brendan Shinnimin (7); 18:37 - pp - Patrick Holland (5)		Second period		Sven Bärtschi (6) - 8:25; Cam Reid (4) - 15:48
9:07 - pp - Patrick Holland (6); 15:09 - Mitch Topping (3)		Third period		Joe Morrow (3) - pp - 10:56
No scoring		First overtime period		Marcel Noebels (3) - 7:52
Ty Rimmer (26 saves / 31 shots)		Goalie stats		Mac Carruth (43 saves / 47 shots)

April 21	Tri-City Americans	4 – 5	OT	Portland Winterhawks	Toyota Center	Recap
4:27 - pp - Jordan Messier (1); 8:50 - Adam Hughesman (7)		First period		Ty Rattie (14) - pp - 13:39
0:46 - pp - Patrick Holland (6)		Second period		Brad Ross (10) - 13:01
4:52 - Justin Feser (4)		Third period		Joey Baker (1) - 9:55; Ty Rattie (15) - pp - 18:07
No scoring		First overtime period		Ty Rattie (16) - sh - 7:58
Ty Rimmer (43 saves / 48 shots)		Goalie stats		Mac Carruth (34 saves / 38 shots)

April 25	Portland Winterhawks	3 – 1	Tri-City Americans	Moda Center	Recap
No scoring		First period	Adam Hughesman (8) - 1:16
10:40 - Marcel Noebels (4)		Second period	No scoring
11:21 - pp - Ty Rattie (17); 19:26 - en - Brad Ross (11)		Third period	No scoring
Mac Carruth (38 saves / 39 shots)		Goalie stats	Ty Rimmer (44 saves / 46 shots)

April 26	Portland Winterhawks	4 – 1	Tri-City Americans	Moda Center	Recap
No scoring		First period	Adam Hughesman (9) - pp - 17:40
No scoring		Second period	No scoring
6:42 - Cam Reid (5); 7:38 - Marcel Noebels (5); 16:57 - Sven Bärtschi (7); 17:23 - Brad Ross (12)		Third period	No scoring
Mac Carruth (39 saves / 40 shots)		Goalie stats	Ty Rimmer (57 saves / 61 shots)

Portland wins series 4 – 0

== WHL Championship ==
=== (E1) Edmonton Oil Kings vs. (W3) Portland Winterhawks ===
May 3	Edmonton Oil Kings	3 – 2	Portland Winterhawks	Rexall Place	Recap
1:25 - Rhett Rachinski (4)		First period	No scoring
4:59 - Martin Gernát (6); 14:30 - sh - Jordan Peddle (4)		Second period	Marcel Noebels (6) - 14:42; Sven Bärtschi (8) - 16:39
No scoring		Third period	No scoring
Laurent Brossoit (24 saves / 26 shots)		Goalie stats	Mac Carruth (26 saves / 29 shots)

May 4	Edmonton Oil Kings	1 – 5	Portland Winterhawks	Rexall Place	Recap
No scoring		First period	Brendan Leipsic (5) - 2:37
No scoring		Second period	Brendan Leipsic (6) - 9:20; Sven Bärtschi (9) - pp - 10:28; Taylor Peters (1) - 18:38
4:44 - Kristiāns Pelšs (5)		Third period	Sven Bärtschi (10) - en - 18:34
Laurent Brossoit (22 saves / 26 shots)		Goalie stats	Mac Carruth (38 saves / 39 shots)

May 6	Portland Winterhawks	4 – 3	Edmonton Oil Kings	Moda Center	Recap
No scoring		First period	No scoring
4:53 - Sven Bärtschi (11); 12:06 - pp - Ty Rattie (18); 12:35 - pp - Oliver Gabriel (3)		Second period	No scoring
4:37 - Brendan Leipsic (7)		Third period	Henrik Samuelsson (4) - pp - 0:20; Martin Gernát (7) - 7:16; Keegan Lowe (3) - 10:34
Mac Carruth (34 saves / 37 shots)		Goalie stats	Laurent Brossoit (29 saves / 33 shots)

May 8	Portland Winterhawks	3 – 4	OT	Edmonton Oil Kings	Moda Center	Recap
1:21 - Marcel Noebels (7)		First period		Rhett Rachinski (5) - 15:50
No scoring		Second period		Tyler Maxwell (4) - 8:17; Stephane Legault (4) - 19:04
3:49 - Sven Bärtschi (12); 9:06 - Sven Bärtschi (13)		Third period		No scoring
No scoring		First overtime period		Rhett Rachinski (6) - 9:07
Mac Carruth (38 saves / 42 shots)		Goalie stats		Laurent Brossoit (39 saves / 42 shots)

May 10	Edmonton Oil Kings	4 – 3	Portland Winterhawks	Rexall Place	Recap
18:00 - Jordan Peddle (5)		First period	Marcel Noebels (8) - 1:45
4:44 - Griffin Reinhart (2); 7:20 - Jordan Peddle (6)		Second period	Ty Rattie (19) - pp - 5:27
19:04 - Mark Pysyk (3)		Third period	Sven Bärtschi (14) - 5:07
Laurent Brossoit (28 saves / 31 shots)		Goalie stats	Mac Carruth (31 saves / 35 shots)

May 12	Portland Winterhawks	3 – 2	Edmonton Oil Kings	Moda Center	Recap
11:07 - Oliver Gabriel (4)		First period	Michael St. Croix (6) - 7:53
No scoring		Second period	No scoring
8:44 - Joe Morrow (4); 17:21 - Oliver Gabriel (5)		Third period	Stephane Legault (5) - 11:05
Mac Carruth (30 saves / 32 shots)		Goalie stats	Laurent Brossoit (42 saves / 45 shots)

May 13	Edmonton Oil Kings	4 – 1	Portland Winterhawks	Rexall Place	Recap
1:51 - Rhett Rachinski (7); 19:42 - Tyler Maxwell (5)		First period	No scoring
4:41 - Michael St. Croix (7); 10:16 - T.J. Foster (3)		Second period	Oliver Gabriel (6) - 11:40
No scoring		Third period	No scoring
Laurent Brossoit (19 saves / 20 shots)		Goalie stats	Mac Carruth (28 saves / 32 shots)

Edmonton wins series 4 – 3

== Playoff scoring leaders ==
Note: GP = Games played; G = Goals; A = Assists; Pts = Points; PIM = Penalty minutes

Player	Team	GP	G	A	Pts	PIM
Sven Baertschi	Portland Winterhawks	22	14	20	34	10
Ty Rattie	Portland Winterhawks	21	19	14	33	12
Marcel Noebels	Portland Winterhawks	22	8	15	23	6
Brendan Shinnimin	Tri-City Americans	15	7	16	23	28
Brad Ross	Portland Winterhawks	22	12	10	22	57
Adam Hughesman	Tri-City Americans	15	9	10	19	12
Curtis Lazar	Edmonton Oil Kings	20	8	11	19	4
Michael St. Croix	Edmonton Oil Kings	20	7	12	19	6
Patrick Holland	Tri-City Americans	14	6	13	19	22
James Henry	Moose Jaw Warriors	14	6	12	18	16

== Playoff leading goaltenders ==
Note: GP = Games played; Mins = Minutes played; W = Wins; L = Losses; GA = Goals Allowed; SO = Shutouts; SV& = Save percentage; GAA = Goals against average

Player	Team	GP	Mins	W	L	GA	SO	Sv%	GAA
Brandon Glover	Calgary Hitmen	4	224	1	2	7	1	0.941	1.87
Laurent Brossoit	Edmonton Oil Kings	20	1204	16	4	41	2	0.933	2.04
Eric Williams	Spokane Chiefs	12	702	7	4	26	0	0.926	2.22
Ty Rimmer	Tri-City Americans	15	951	8	7	39	1	0.919	2.46
Justin Paulic	Moose Jaw Warriors	2	117	1	1	5	0	0.906	2.57

== WHL awards ==
Scotty Munro Memorial Trophy	Regular season champions	Edmonton Oil Kings	
Four Broncos Memorial Trophy	Player of the Year	Brendan Shinnimin	Tri-City Americans
Bob Clarke Trophy	Top Scorer	Brendan Shinnimin	Tri-City Americans
Bill Hunter Trophy	Top Defenseman	Alex Petrovic	Red Deer Rebels
Jim Piggott Memorial Trophy	Rookie of the Year	Sam Reinhart	Kootenay Ice
Del Wilson Trophy	Top Goaltender	Tyler Bunz	Medicine Hat Tigers
WHL Plus-Minus Award	Top Plus-Minus Rating	Mark Stone	Brandon Wheat Kings
Brad Hornung Trophy	Most Sportsmanlike Player	Mark Stone	Brandon Wheat Kings
Daryl K. (Doc) Seaman Trophy	Scholastic Player of the Year	Reid Gow	Spokane Chiefs
Jim Donlevy Memorial Trophy	Scholastic team of the Year	Edmonton Oil Kings	
Dunc McCallum Memorial Trophy	Coach of the Year	Jim Hiller	Tri-City Americans
Lloyd Saunders Memorial Trophy	Executive of the Year	Bob Green	Edmonton Oil Kings
Allen Paradice Memorial Trophy	Top Official	Pat Smith	
St. Clair Group Trophy	Marketing/Public Relations Award	Corey Nyhagen	Moose Jaw Warriors
Doug Wickenheiser Memorial Trophy	Humanitarian of the Year	Taylor Vause	Swift Current Broncos
WHL Playoff MVP	WHL Finals Most Valuable Player	Laurent Brossoit	Edmonton Oil Kings
Professional Hockey Achievement; Academic Recipient	Alumni Achievement Awards	Scott Niedermayer	

=== All-Star teams ===
==== Eastern Conference ====
First Team		Pos.	Second Team	
Player	Team	Pos.	Player	Team
Tyler Bunz	Medicine Hat Tigers	G	Nathan Lieuwen	Kootenay Ice
Alex Petrovic	Red Deer Rebels	D	Mark Pysyk	Edmonton Oil Kings
Ryan Pulock	Brandon Wheat Kings	D	Brandon Davidson	Regina Pats
Emerson Etem	Medicine Hat Tigers	F	Michael St. Croix	Edmonton Oil Kings
Mark Stone	Brandon Wheat Kings	F	Max Reinhart	Kootenay Ice
Jordan Weal	Regina Pats	F	Micheal Ferland	Brandon Wheat Kings

==== Western Conference ====
First Team		Pos.	Second Team	
Player	Team	Pos.	Player	Team
Ty Rimmer	Tri-City Americans	G	Cole Cheveldave	Kamloops Blazers
Brenden Kichton	Spokane Chiefs	D	Ryan Murray	Everett Silvertips
Joe Morrow	Portland Winterhawks	D	Austin Madaisky	Kamloops Blazers
Ty Rattie	Portland Winterhawks	F	Sven Bartschi	Portland Winterhawks
Brendan Shinnimin	Tri-City Americans	F	Adam Hughesman	Tri-City Americans
Brendan Gallagher	Vancouver Giants	F	Patrick Holland	Tri-City Americans

== See also ==
- List of WHL seasons
- 2011–12 OHL season
- 2011–12 QMJHL season
- 2011 in ice hockey
- 2012 in ice hockey

Preceded by 2010–11 WHL season	WHL seasons	Succeeded by 2012–13 WHL season
