= Bettauer =

Bettauer is a German language habitational surname. Notable people with the name include:

- Hugo Bettauer (1872–1925), Austrian writer and journalist
- James Bettauer (1991), Canadian-German professional ice hockey player
- Margot Bettauer Dembo (1928–2019), German-born American translator of fiction and non-fiction
- Robert Bettauer (1956), Canadian tennis broadcaster and former professional player
