= Matt Konan =

American ice hockey player

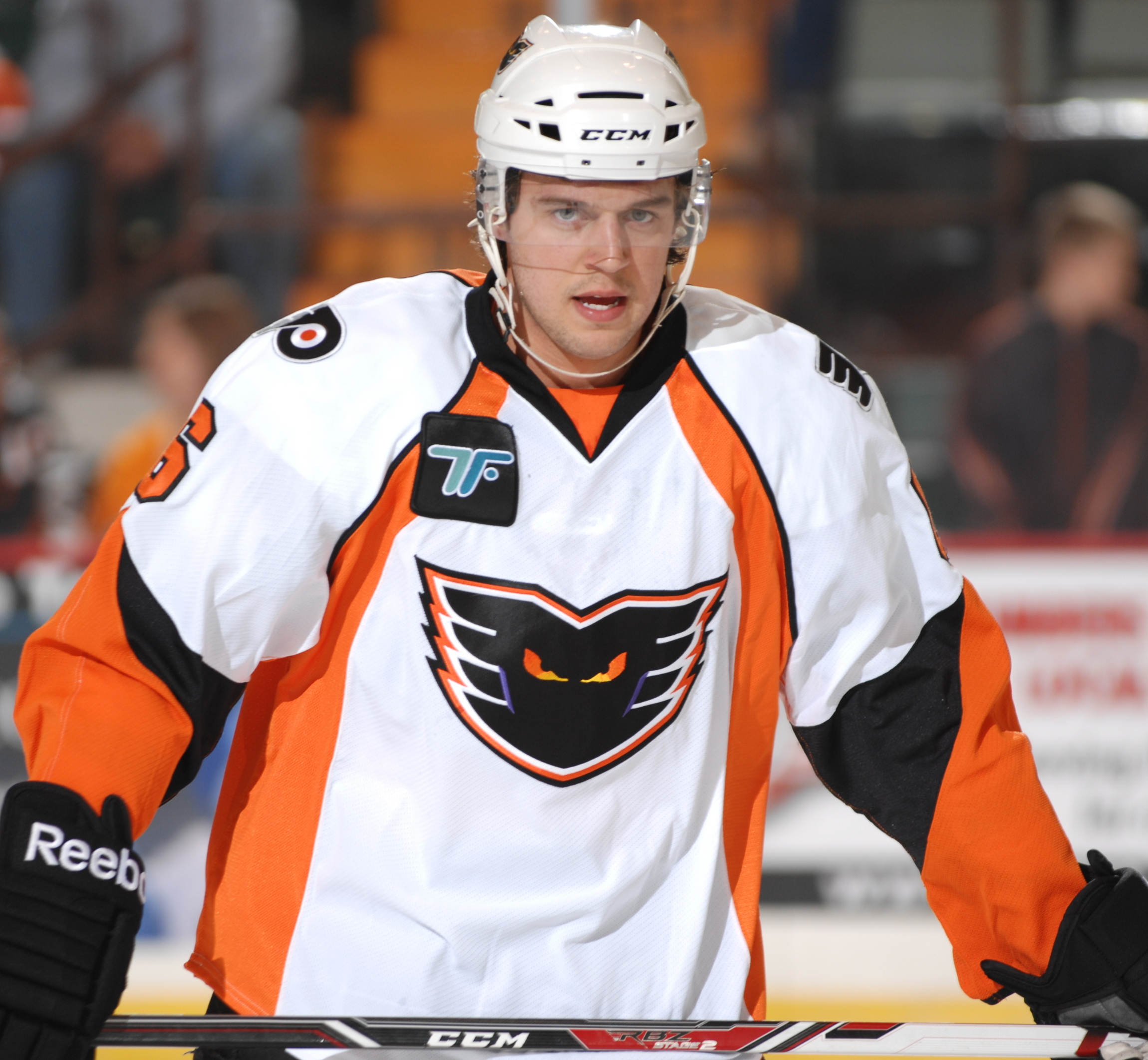
- Konan with the Adirondack Phantoms in 2013
- Born: September 3, 1991 (age 34) Tustin, California, U.S.
- Height: 6 ft 3 in (191 cm)
- Weight: 182 lb (83 kg; 13 st 0 lb)
- Position: Defense
- Shot: Left
- Played for: Philadelphia Flyers
- NHL draft: Undrafted
- Playing career: 2012–2016

Matthew Thomas Konan (born September 3, 1991) is an American former professional ice hockey defenseman. He played 2 games in the National Hockey League (NHL) for the Philadelphia Flyers during the 2012–13 season. The rest of his career, which lasted from 2012 to 2016, was spent in the minor leagues.

== Playing career ==
As a youth, Konan played in the 2004 Quebec International Pee-Wee Hockey Tournament with a minor ice hockey team from Los Angeles.

Prior to turning professional, Konan played junior hockey from 2007 to 2012 with the Medicine Hat Tigers of the WHL where, over five seasons, he played 301 games and scored 107 points.

On April 2, 2012, Konan signed a three-year entry-level contract with Philadelphia Flyers. He played most of the 2012–13 season in the AHL where he played 45 games with the Adirondack Phantoms. Konan was recalled by the Flyers after the Phantoms season ended and he made his NHL debut on April 25, 2013, against the New York Islanders.

During a December 20, 2013 game, Konan was elbowed by the Norfolk Admirals' Dave Steckel and left the game with a concussion. He missed the next 15 months and returned at the end of the 2014–15 season, appearing in 3 games with the Lehigh Valley Phantoms. Konan's entry-level contract expired after the season and the Flyers did not issue him a qualifying offer in order to retain his NHL rights, which made him an unrestricted free agent.

On October 5, 2015, Konan signed a contract with the Tulsa Oilers of the ECHL.

== Career statistics ==
=== Regular season and playoffs ===
			Regular season					Playoffs
Season	Team	League	GP	G	A	Pts	PIM	GP	G	A	Pts	PIM
2007–08	Medicine Hat Tigers	WHL	42	0	4	4	21	3	0	0	0	0
2008–09	Medicine Hat Tigers	WHL	61	1	11	12	53	11	0	1	1	10
2009–10	Medicine Hat Tigers	WHL	65	5	15	20	117	12	1	4	5	10
2010–11	Medicine Hat Tigers	WHL	61	4	13	17	69	15	0	6	6	15
2011–12	Medicine Hat Tigers	WHL	72	9	45	54	73	8	2	3	5	14
2012–13	Philadelphia Flyers	NHL	2	0	0	0	0	—	—	—	—	—
2012–13	Adirondack Phantoms	AHL	45	2	4	6	54	—	—	—	—	—
2012–13	Trenton Titans	ECHL	5	0	1	1	2	—	—	—	—	—
2013–14	Adirondack Phantoms	AHL	26	0	2	2	22	—	—	—	—	—
2014–15	Lehigh Valley Phantoms	AHL	3	0	0	0	0	—	—	—	—	—
2015–16	Tulsa Oilers	ECHL	46	3	14	17	39	—	—	—	—	—
NHL totals			2	0	0	0	0	—	—	—	—	—
