= Brendan Shinnimin =

Canadian ice hockey player

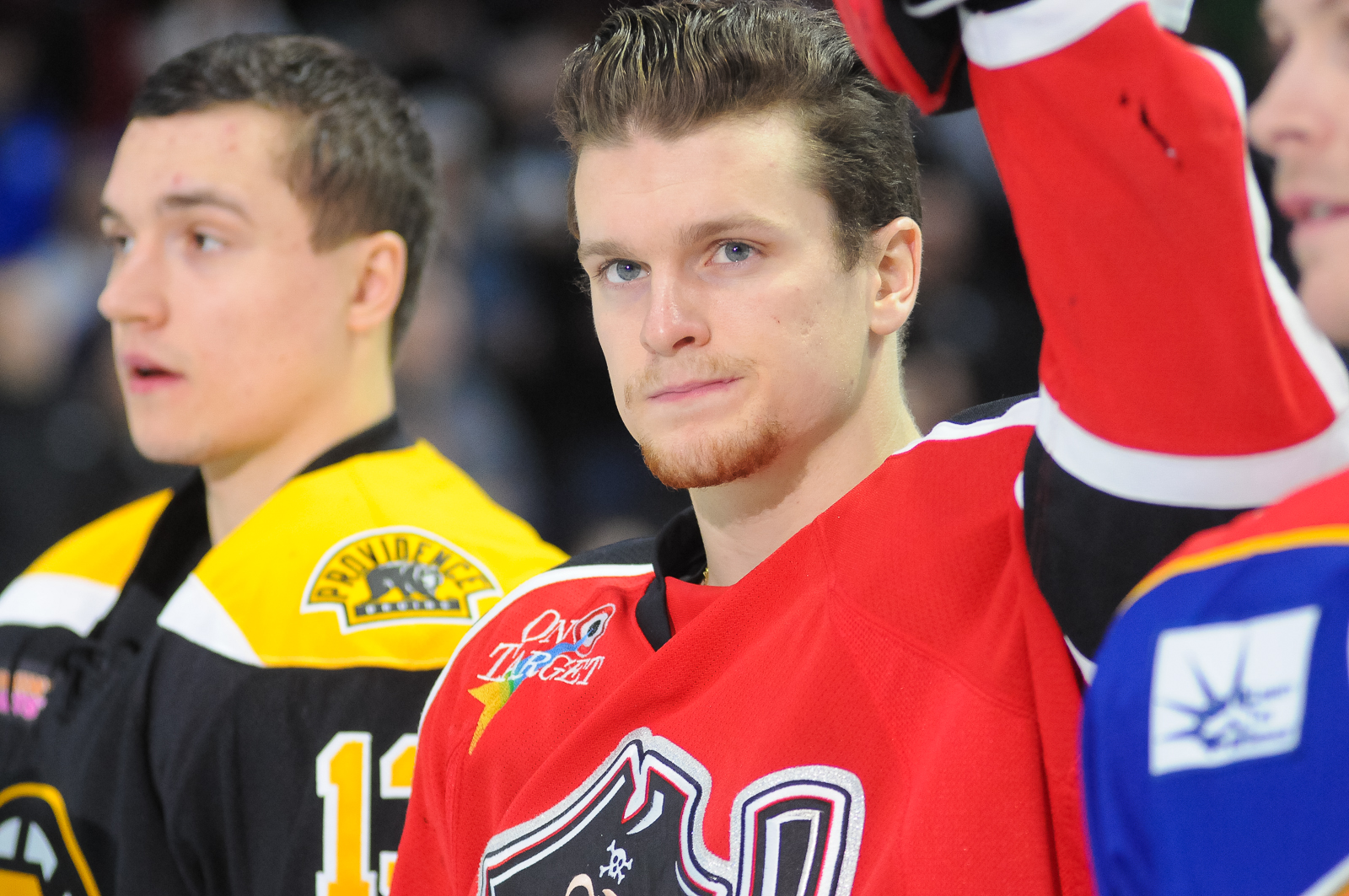
- Shinnimin (middle) at the 2015 AHL All-Star Game
- Born: January 7, 1991 (age 35) East Saint Paul, Manitoba, Canada
- Height: 5 ft 10 in (178 cm)
- Weight: 181 lb (82 kg; 12 st 13 lb)
- Position: Centre
- Shoots: Left
- SHL team Former teams: Luleå HF; Arizona Coyotes; SCL Tigers; Barys Astana; Växjö Lakers; Adler Mannheim; HC Slovan Bratislava
- NHL draft: Undrafted
- Playing career: 2012–present

Brendan Shinnimin (born January 7, 1991) is a Canadian professional ice hockey centre playing for Luleå HF of the Swedish Hockey League (SHL). He has previously played for the Arizona Coyotes of the National Hockey League (NHL).

== Playing career ==
Shinnimin played junior hockey for the Tri-City Americans of the Western Hockey League (WHL). Shinnimin was the WHL's leading scoring for the 2011–12 WHL season with 134 points, earning him the 2012 Bob Clarke Trophy. He not only led the WHL in scoring, but was the leading scorer in the entire Canadian Hockey League. He won the Four Broncos Memorial Trophy in 2012 as the WHL Player of the Year and was a unanimous pick as a Western Conference first team all-star. He ended his junior career with a 38-game point scoring streak, beginning on February 3, 2012, during which he scored 83 points. In 2010–11, he was named a WHL second-team all-star. He would also be awarded the CHL Player of the Year award as the best overall player in the CHL.

On October 19, 2010, Shinnimin was given a 12-game suspension - the longest in that league over the past four seasons – for his "dangerous hit-from-behind" which resulted in a concussion and a bruised back for Josh Nicholls of the Saskatoon Blades. In 2009, he played for Team WHL in the Subway Super Series against a team of Russian junior all-stars.

Shinnimin was not drafted in the NHL entry draft. On March 2, 2012, the Phoenix Coyotes of the National Hockey League signed Shinnimin as a free-agent to a three-year entry-level contract.

Following the 2014–15 NHL season Shinnimin became a restricted free agent under the NHL Collective Bargaining Agreement. The Arizona Coyotes made him a qualifying offer to retain his NHL rights and, on July 5, 2015, Shinnimin filed for Salary Arbitration.

On July 14, 2016, Shinnimin agreed to a one-year contract with the SCL Tigers of the National League A (NLA). He made his NLA debut on September 9, 2016, at the PostFinance Arena against Canton rival, SC Bern. On December 21, 2016, the Tigers released Shinnimin after having appeared in only 12 games out of 32. Later that month, he inked a deal with Barys Astana of the Kontinental Hockey League (KHL).

Following three successful seasons in the Swedish Hockey League with the Växjö Lakers, Shinnimin opted to extend his European career by moving to German club, Adler Mannheim of the DEL, on a one-year contract for the 2020–21 season on September 4, 2020.

== Career statistics ==
			Regular season					Playoffs
Season	Team	League	GP	G	A	Pts	PIM	GP	G	A	Pts	PIM
2006–07	Winnipeg Thrashers	MMHL	31	10	27	37	28	12	4	11	15	8
2007–08	Selkirk Steelers	MJHL	51	7	19	26	38	5	1	0	1	5
2007–08	Tri-City Americans	WHL	4	0	0	0	0	—	—	—	—	—
2008–09	Tri-City Americans	WHL	64	12	13	25	69	11	0	5	5	16
2009–10	Tri-City Americans	WHL	70	27	55	82	82	22	8	17	25	29
2010–11	Tri-City Americans	WHL	60	34	62	96	84	10	4	7	11	16
2011–12	Tri-City Americans	WHL	69	58	76	134	82	15	7	16	23	28
2012–13	Portland Pirates	AHL	74	12	21	33	77	1	0	1	1	0
2013–14	Portland Pirates	AHL	52	13	15	28	31	—	—	—	—	—
2014–15	Portland Pirates	AHL	64	22	25	47	80	5	2	4	6	8
2014–15	Arizona Coyotes	NHL	12	0	1	1	8	—	—	—	—	—
2015–16	Springfield Falcons	AHL	30	5	9	14	36	—	—	—	—	—
2016–17	SCL Tigers	NLA	12	2	7	9	12	—	—	—	—	—
2016–17	Barys Astana	KHL	17	2	4	6	12	10	1	0	1	16
2017–18	Växjö Lakers	SHL	45	14	20	34	83	13	2	8	10	30
2018–19	Växjö Lakers	SHL	47	17	16	33	86	4	3	2	5	4
2019–20	Växjö Lakers	SHL	50	5	17	22	91	—	—	—	—	—
2020–21	Adler Mannheim	DEL	25	9	5	14	14	6	1	1	2	6
2021–22	Luleå HF	SHL	52	14	13	27	36	17	1	3	4	20
2022–23	Luleå HF	SHL	51	17	14	31	65	10	5	1	6	12
2023–24	Luleå HF	SHL	50	16	14	30	88	7	1	0	1	2
2024–25	Luleå HF	SHL	47	16	16	32	53	17	7	5	12	28
NHL totals			12	0	1	1	8	—	—	—	—	—
SHL totals			342	99	110	209	502	68	19	19	38	96

== Awards and honours ==
Award	Year
WHL
Second All-Star Team (West)	2010–11
Four Broncos Memorial Trophy	2011–12
Bob Clarke Trophy as WHL leading scorer	2011–12
First All-Star Team (West)	2011–12
AHL
All-Star Game	2015
SHL
Le Mat Trophy (Växjö Lakers, Luleå HF)	2018, 2025
