= Duncan Siemens =

Canadian ice hockey player

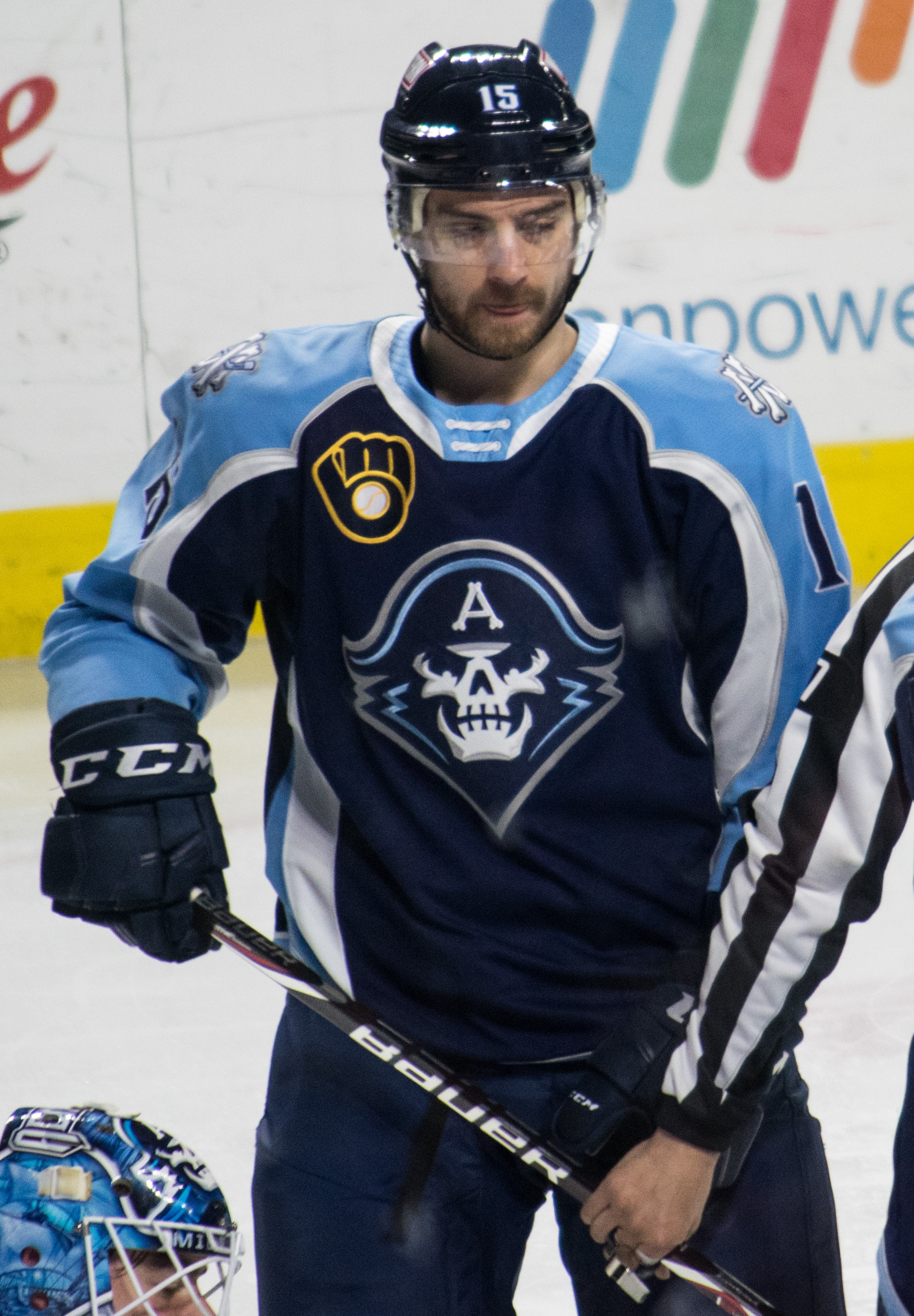
- Siemens with the Milwaukee Admirals in 2019
- Born: September 7, 1993 (age 32) Sherwood Park, Alberta, Canada
- Height: 6 ft 3 in (191 cm)
- Weight: 210 lb (95 kg; 15 st 0 lb)
- Position: Defence
- Shot: Left
- Played for: Colorado Avalanche
- NHL draft: 11th overall, 2011; Colorado Avalanche
- Playing career: 2012–2019

Duncan Siemens (born September 7, 1993) is a Canadian former professional ice hockey defenceman. He was selected in the first round, 11th overall, by the Colorado Avalanche in the 2011 NHL entry draft. He played briefly with the Avalanche in the National Hockey League (NHL).

== Playing career ==
=== Junior ===
Siemens was raised in Sherwood Park, Alberta. He first played hockey as a bantam with the Sherwood Park Flyers in the Alberta Midget Bantam Hockey League. After two years with the Flyers, Siemens remained in Sherwood and progressed to play midget hockey with the Sherwood Park Kings. Showing a good skating ability for a large frame, Siemens opted to play major junior hockey with the Saskatoon Blades in the Western Hockey League making his debut at the tail end of the 2008–09 season.

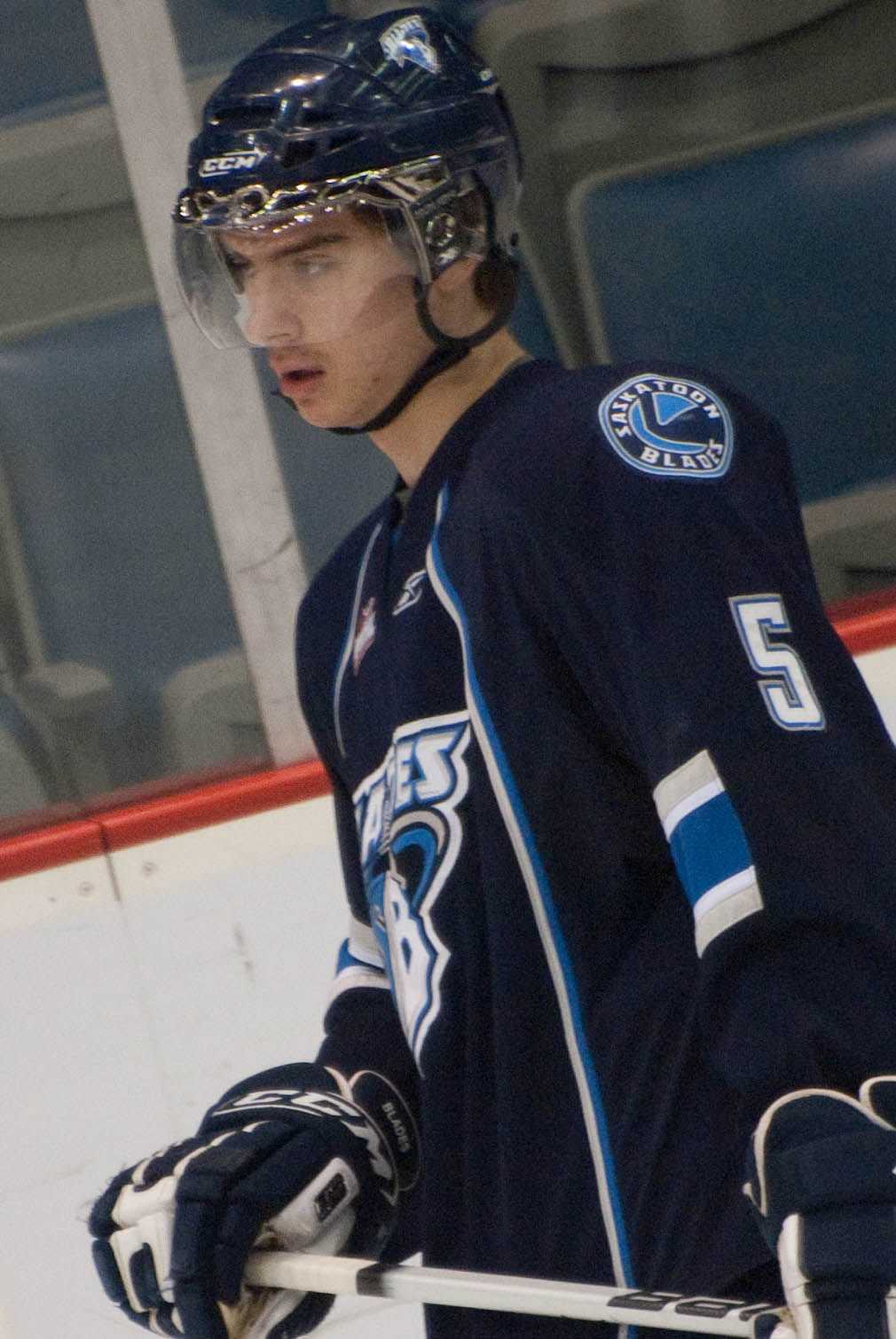
Siemens during his tenure with the Saskatoon Blades.

In his rookie year with the Blades as a 16-year-old, Siemens appeared in 57 games from the blueline contributing with 20 points for the 2009–10 season. Showing early promise, Siemens was selected to Canada's under-18 team for the 2010 Ivan Hlinka Memorial Tournament, in which they captured the gold medal. In the 2011–12 season, Siemens was elevated to the Blades' top pairing alongside Avalanche draft pick, Stefan Elliott. Combining in a formidable partnership, Siemens whilst defensively minded contributed with a career high 43 points in 72 games, earning a selection to the WHL's Second All-Star Team.

Rated as the fourth best North American defenseman by the NHL Central Scouting and despite being one of the youngest eligible in age, Siemens was selected 11th overall in the 2011 NHL entry draft by the Colorado Avalanche, with the pick acquired from the St Louis Blues along with Erik Johnson and Jay McClement in exchange for a second round pick, Chris Stewart and Kevin Shattenkirk. On July 28, 2011 the Colorado Avalanche signed Siemens to a three-year deal.

Following his first training camp with the Avalanche he was returned to Captain the Saskatoon Blades for the 2011–12 season. Without the offensive presence of Elliott alongside, Siemens offensive output suffered with 28 points. He was limited to 57 games due to a concussion suffered against the Medicine Hat Tigers on January 4, 2012, ruling him out for a month. Following a first-round exit with the Blades, Siemens signed an amateur try-out contract with Colorado's AHL affiliate, the Lake Erie Monsters on March 31, 2012. He made his professional debut later that night against the Texas Stars in a 4-0 defeat and dressed in two further games.

Approaching his final year in junior in the 2012–13 season with the Blades playing host to the Memorial Cup, Siemens was stripped of the Captaincy at the Blades' training camp by coach Lorne Molleken in favour of newcomer Brendan Walker. While also being left of the leadership team, Siemens struggles matched the Blades to begin the year. Having rediscovered his game throughout the season, Siemens finished third amongst defenceman with 32 points in 70 games. He recorded a Plus/minus of +41 over the final 51 regular season games. In the post-season, the Blades were bundled out of the first round in four games before playing in a further 4 games for 1 assist in the Memorial Cup.

=== Professional ===
After his third Avalanche training camp, Siemens was assigned to begin his first full professional season in 2013–14 with the Monsters. With the intention of modeling his defensive game in the mold of Scott Stevens and Adam Foote, Siemens began the year focusing on his defensive and physical presence. Having missed 28 games due to injury, on February 5, 2014, Siemens belatedly notched his first professional goal and point against the Grand Rapids Griffins. In 46 games with the Monsters, Siemens would finish with 4 points.

In the 2014–15 season, Siemens appeared in 54 games with limited offense in Lake Erie, before again suffering from injury. With the Avalanche out of playoff contention on April 10, 2015, Siemens received his first NHL recall by the Avalanche. He made his debut in the regular season finale against the Chicago Blackhawks, a 3-2 victory on April 11, 2015.

Siemens recorded his first NHL point on an assist on Nathan MacKinnon's single goal in a loss to the Calgary Flames on February 24, 2018. He earned his first NHL goal, and recorded his first NHL fight, on March 1, 2018, against the Calgary Flames.

After five seasons within the Avalanche organization and unable to establish himself at the NHL level, Siemens was not tendered a qualifying offer as an impending restricted free agent by the Avalanche on June 25, 2018. Siemens as a free agent went un-signed over the following summer before accepting an invitation to attend the Calgary Flames 2018 training camp in September. After participating in the pre-season, Siemens was released from his try-out with the Flames. Three months into the 2018–19 season, Siemens was signed to a one-year AHL contract with the Milwaukee Admirals, affiliate to the Nashville Predators on December 5, 2018.

== Career statistics ==
=== Regular season and playoffs ===
			Regular season					Playoffs
Season	Team	League	GP	G	A	Pts	PIM	GP	G	A	Pts	PIM
2008–09	Sherwood Park Kings	AMHL	34	5	13	18	68	—	—	—	—	—
2008–09	Saskatoon Blades	WHL	2	0	1	1	2	—	—	—	—	—
2009–10	Saskatoon Blades	WHL	57	3	17	20	89	7	0	0	0	11
2010–11	Saskatoon Blades	WHL	72	5	38	43	121	10	1	3	4	15
2011–12	Saskatoon Blades	WHL	57	6	22	28	91	4	1	1	2	10
2011–12	Lake Erie Monsters	AHL	3	0	0	0	2	—	—	—	—	—
2012–13	Saskatoon Blades	WHL	70	3	29	32	109	4	0	1	1	2
2013–14	Lake Erie Monsters	AHL	46	1	3	4	45	—	—	—	—	—
2014–15	Lake Erie Monsters	AHL	54	0	6	6	57	—	—	—	—	—
2014–15	Colorado Avalanche	NHL	1	0	0	0	0	—	—	—	—	—
2015–16	San Antonio Rampage	AHL	53	1	6	7	90	—	—	—	—	—
2016–17	San Antonio Rampage	AHL	73	2	5	7	100	—	—	—	—	—
2016–17	Colorado Avalanche	NHL	3	0	0	0	2	—	—	—	—	—
2017–18	San Antonio Rampage	AHL	45	1	6	7	47	—	—	—	—	—
2017–18	Colorado Avalanche	NHL	16	1	1	2	23	5	0	0	0	0
2018–19	Milwaukee Admirals	AHL	48	2	5	7	77	5	0	0	0	12
NHL totals			20	1	1	2	25	5	0	0	0	0

=== International ===
Year	Team	Event	Result	GP	G	A	Pts	PIM
2010	Canada Pacific	U17	1st place, gold medalist(s)	5	0	0	0	10
2010	Canada	IH18	1st place, gold medalist(s)	5	1	2	3	6
Junior totals				10	1	2	3	16

== Awards and honours ==
Award	Year
WHL
Second All-Star Team	2011
CHL Top Prospects Game	2011

Awards and achievements
Preceded by Gabriel Landeskog	Colorado Avalanche first-round draft pick 2011	Succeeded by Nathan MacKinnon
