= Robin Soudek =

Czech ice hockey player

- Born: July 31, 1991 (age 35) České Budějovice, Czechoslovakia
- Height: 5 ft 10 in (178 cm)
- Weight: 165 lb (75 kg; 11 st 11 lb)
- Position: Forward
- Shoots: Right
- AlpsHL team Former teams: Sc Riessersee; HC České Budějovice; Lake Erie Monsters; Diables Rouges de Briançon; Dauphins d'Épinal; Eispiraten Crimmitschau
- NHL draft: Undrafted
- Playing career: 2012–present

Robin Soudek (born July 31, 1991) is a Czech professional ice hockey player. He is currently playing with SC Riessersee in the Oberliga (DEL3).

== Playing career ==
Soudek played in his youth with HC České Budějovice before he was drafted 12 overall in the 2008 CHL import draft by the Edmonton Oil Kings of the Western Hockey League. Undrafted after his junior career with the Oil Kings, Chilliwack Bruins and Victoria Royals, Soudek returned to his original club, České Budějovice, in his native Czech Republic. During the 2012–13 season, he appeared in just 11 games for his first professional season.

With a lack of playing time, Soudek was prompted to return to North America and accepted an invite to the Lake Erie Monsters training camp for the 2013–14 season. Unable to earn a contract, Soudek was reassigned to CHL affiliate, the Denver Cutthroats to begin the year. On February 12, 2014, Soudek earned a recall to the Monsters, scoring in his first AHL game in a 5–4 shootout victory over the Oklahoma City Barons on February 15, before later returning to help the Cutthroats reach the Ray Miron Cup finals.

On September 3, 2014, Soudek as a free agent signed a one-year standard player contract with the Stockton Thunder of the ECHL. In the 2014–15 season, Soudek scored 4 goals and 6 points in 9 games with the Thunder before he was traded to the Rapid City Rush on November 9, 2014.

On July 20, 2015, Soudek opted to return to his native country, agreeing to a try-out contract with HC Olomouc of the Czech Extraliga. He was later released without an offer of a contract.

== Career statistics ==
=== Regular season and playoffs ===
			Regular season					Playoffs
Season	Team	League	GP	G	A	Pts	PIM	GP	G	A	Pts	PIM
2008–09	Edmonton Oil Kings	WHL	63	7	6	13	42	4	1	1	2	4
2009–10	Edmonton Oil Kings	WHL	61	11	13	24	41	—	—	—	—	—
2010–11	Chilliwack Bruins	WHL	61	25	32	57	70	5	2	1	3	4
2011–12	Victoria Royals	WHL	65	27	30	57	114	4	2	0	2	0
2012–13	HC České Budějovice	CZE	11	1	1	2	10	—	—	—	—	—
2013–14	Denver Cutthroats	CHL	41	14	6	20	62	10	3	4	7	14
2013–14	Lake Erie Monsters	AHL	3	1	0	1	0	—	—	—	—	—
2014–15	Stockton Thunder	ECHL	9	4	2	6	4	—	—	—	—	—
2014–15	Rapid City Rush	ECHL	20	6	9	15	38	—	—	—	—	—
2014–15	Evansville IceMen	ECHL	33	8	10	18	22	—	—	—	—	—
2015–16	Diables Rouges de Briançon	FRA	15	9	10	19	47	10	6	5	11	14
2016–17	Gamyo d'Épinal	FRA	43	19	12	31	92	4	2	2	4	14
2017–18	Gamyo d'Épinal	FRA	42	17	17	34	36	1	1	0	1	0
2017–18	ETC Crimmitschau	DEL2	1	0	0	0	0	6	3	3	6	25
Czech totals			11	1	1	2	10	—	—	—	—	—

=== International ===
Year	Team	Event	Result	GP	G	A	Pts	PIM
2009	Czech Republic	WJC18	6th	6	1	1	2	6
2011	Czech Republic	WJC	7th	6	0	0	0	6
Junior totals				12	1	1	2	12
