= Ty Rimmer =

Canadian ice hockey player

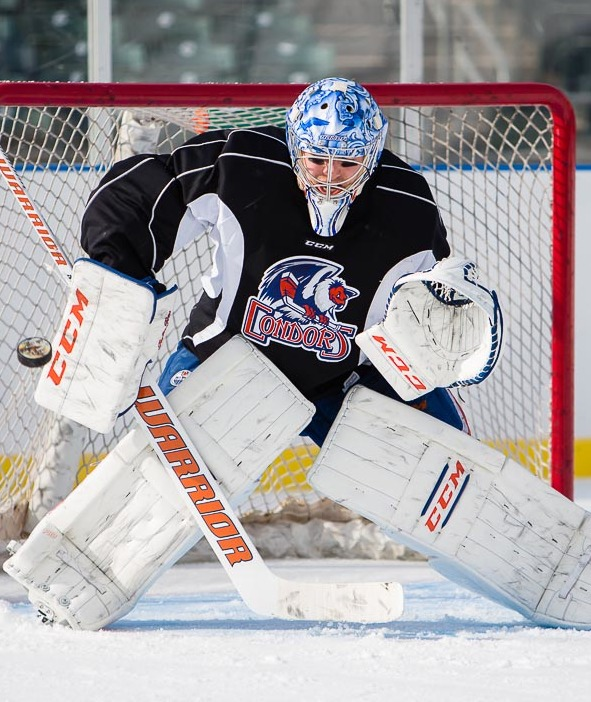
- Rimmer with the Bakersfield Condors in 2015
- Born: March 23, 1992 (age 34) Edmonton, Alberta, Canada
- Height: 6 ft 1 in (185 cm)
- Weight: 190 lb (86 kg; 13 st 8 lb)
- Position: Goaltender
- Catches: Left
- team Former teams: Free Agent; Manchester Monarchs; Oklahoma City Barons; Bakersfield Condors; WSV Sterzing Broncos; EC Kitzbühel
- NHL draft: Undrafted
- Playing career: 2013–present

Tyler "Ty" Rimmer (born March 23, 1992) is a Canadian professional ice hockey Goaltender. He is currently an unrestricted free agent who most recently played with the Cincinnati Cyclones of the ECHL.

== Playing career ==
He played junior hockey in the Western Hockey League. He was traded to the Lethbridge Hurricanes from the Tri-City Americans on May 3, 2012.

In January 2015, Rimmer was diagnosed with testicular cancer. By March, 2015, Rimmer made a full recovery and joined Oklahoma City Barons for remainder of 2014–15 season.

On May 27, 2015, Rimmer remained in the Edmonton Oilers organization in signing a one-year AHL contract with the Bakersfield Condors. Rimmer appeared in 6 games with the Condors before he was reassigned to new ECHL affiliate, the Norfolk Admirals.

After three seasons within the Oilers affiliates, Rimmer left as a free agent and agreed to a one-year deal with Italian club, WSV Sterzing Broncos for the inaugural season in the Alps Hockey League on September 21, 2016.

Rimmer played one season in Italy before returning to North America and the ECHL, agreeing to a one-year deal with the Kansas City Mavericks on August 30, 2017. Prior to the commencement of the 2017–18 season, Rimmer was traded before appearing with the Mavericks to fellow ECHL outfit, the Greenville Swamp Rabbits, on October 8, 2017. Over the course of the season, Rimmer as the Swamp Rabbits starting goaltender appeared in 42 games.

As a free agent, Rimmer opted to return to the Alps Hockey League, agreeing to a one-year contract with Austrian-based, EC Kitzbühel, on May 21, 2018. Rimmer made 29 appearances in the Alps Hockey League before returning to North America and signing an ECHL contract with the Wichita Thunder, affiliate to former club, the Bakersfield Condors, on January 23, 2019. Rimmer made 12 appearances with the Thunder before he was traded to the Cincinnati Cyclones on March 7, 2019.

== Awards and honours ==
Honours	Year
WHL First All-Star Team (West)	2011–12
