= Dominik Uher =

Czech ice hockey player (born 1992)

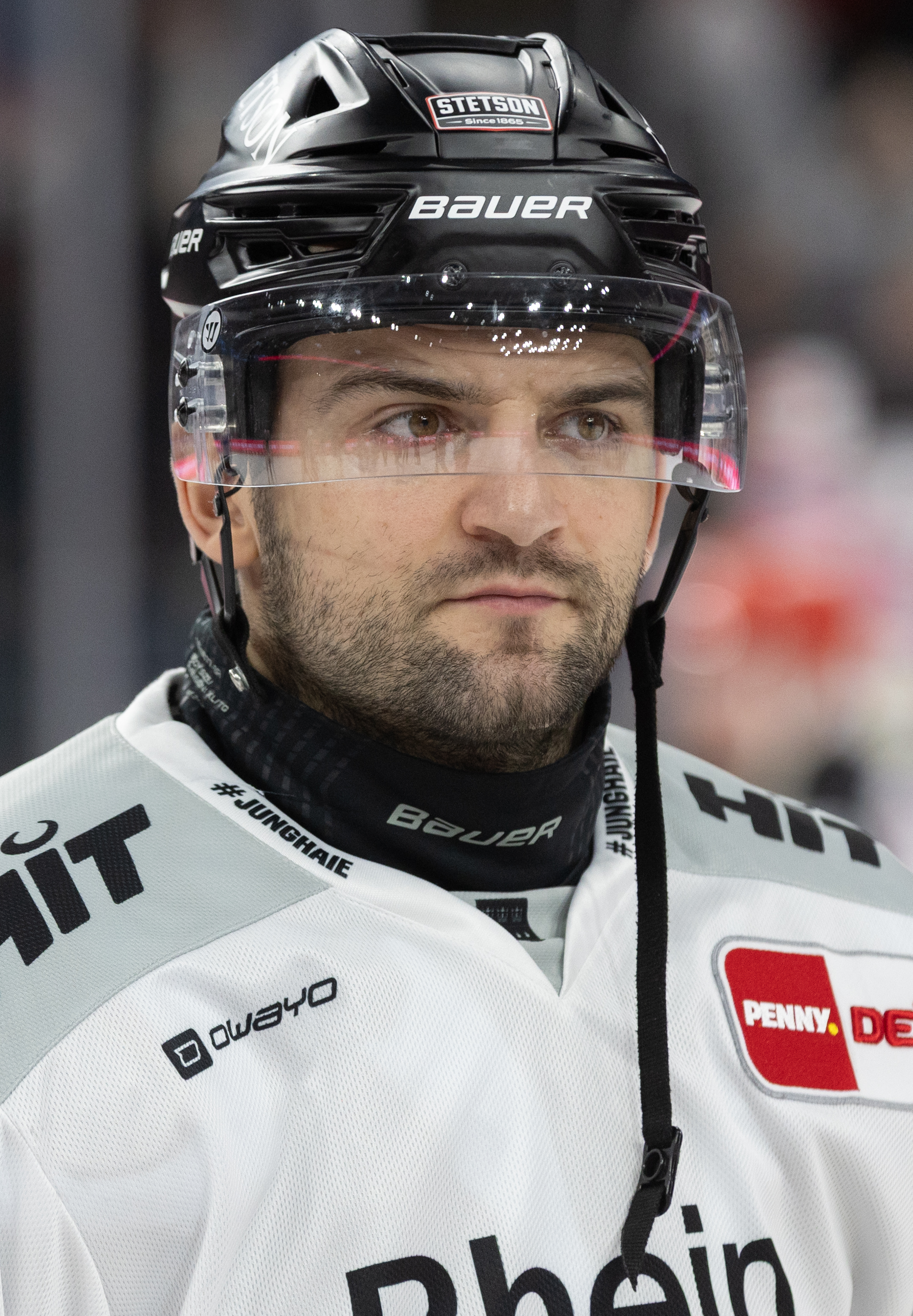
- Uher with the Kölner Haie in 2025
- Born: 31 December 1992 (age 33) Frýdek-Místek, Czechoslovakia
- Height: 6 ft 0 in (183 cm)
- Weight: 203 lb (92 kg; 14 st 7 lb)
- Position: Centre
- Shoots: Left
- DEL team Former teams: Kölner Haie; Pittsburgh Penguins; HC Sparta Praha; Fischtown Pinguins
- NHL draft: 144th overall, 2011; Pittsburgh Penguins
- Playing career: 2012–present

Dominik Uher (born 31 December 1992) is a Czech professional ice hockey forward. He is currently playing with Kölner Haie of the Deutsche Eishockey Liga (DEL). Uher was selected by the Pittsburgh Penguins in the 5th round (144th overall) of the 2011 NHL entry draft. He played two games for the Penguins in 2014–15, and spent several other years with the team's American Hockey League (AHL) affiliate, the Wilkes-Barre/Scranton Penguins.

== Playing career ==
Uher played three seasons with the Spokane Chiefs from 2009 to 2012. He helped lead the Czech Republic to a fifth-place finish at the 2012 World Junior Ice Hockey Championships. Prior to the 2012–13 season, Uher signed a three-year entry-level contract with the Penguins to begin his professional career.

On 1 June 2016, Uher left the Penguins organization as an impending restricted free agent in returning to the Czech Republic to sign a contract with HC Sparta Praha of the ELH.

== Personal ==
His father is the Czech mountain climber, Libor Uher.

== Career statistics ==
			Regular season					Playoffs
Season	Team	League	GP	G	A	Pts	PIM	GP	G	A	Pts	PIM
2005–06	Frýdek-Místek U18	Czech U18-2	14	0	0	0	2	—	—	—	—	—
2006–07	Frýdek-Místek U18	Czech U18-2	27	7	14	21	22	—	—	—	—	—
2006–07	Oceláři Třinec U18	Czech U18	6	1	1	2	2	3	1	0	1	0
2007–08	Frýdek-Místek U18	Czech U18-2	6	3	6	9	10	—	—	—	—	—
2007–08	Oceláři Třinec U18	Czech U18	44	5	11	16	44	5	1	0	1	4
2008–09	Frýdek-Místek U18	Czech U18-2	4	1	2	3	0	—	—	—	—	—
2008–09	Oceláři Třinec U18	Czech U18	38	19	27	46	46	9	5	6	11	6
2008–09	Oceláři Třinec U20	Czech U20	2	0	1	1	2	—	—	—	—	—
2009–10	Spokane Chiefs	WHL	53	4	12	16	45	6	0	0	0	2
2010–11	Spokane Chiefs	WHL	65	21	39	60	60	17	2	9	11	18
2011–12	Spokane Chiefs	WHL	63	33	35	68	60	13	5	4	9	6
2012–13	Wheeling Nailers	ECHL	3	0	1	1	0	—	—	—	—	—
2012–13	Wilkes-Barre/Scranton Penguins	AHL	53	4	3	7	61	8	0	3	3	4
2013–14	Wilkes-Barre/Scranton Penguins	AHL	68	7	16	23	66	12	1	0	1	4
2014–15	Wilkes-Barre/Scranton Penguins	AHL	72	13	13	26	60	8	2	2	4	0
2014–15	Pittsburgh Penguins	NHL	2	0	0	0	0	—	—	—	—	—
2015–16	Wilkes-Barre/Scranton Penguins	AHL	43	5	8	13	29	—	—	—	—	—
2016–17	Sparta Praha	ELH	50	7	15	22	24	4	1	0	1	2
2017–18	Sparta Praha	ELH	48	3	3	6	64	2	0	0	0	14
2018–19	Fischtown Pinguins	DEL	22	1	2	3	20	3	0	2	2	2
2019–20	Fischtown Pinguins	DEL	52	9	7	16	12	—	—	—	—	—
2020–21	Fischtown Pinguins	DEL	38	8	20	28	14	3	2	0	2	0
2021–22	Fischtown Pinguins	DEL	54	10	19	29	51	5	1	0	1	0
2022–23	Fischtown Pinguins	DEL	50	10	10	20	8	8	0	1	1	6
2023–24	Fischtown Pinguins	DEL	45	3	12	15	18	14	2	1	3	2
2024–25	Fischtown Pinguins	DEL	39	5	11	16	2	6	0	0	0	2
NHL totals			2	0	0	0	0	—	—	—	—	—

=== International ===
Year	Team	Event	GP	G	A	Pts	PIM
2010	Czech Republic	WJC18	6	1	1	2	0
2012	Czech Republic	WJC	6	1	2	3	4
Junior totals			12	2	3	5	4
