= Sven Bärtschi =

Swiss ice hockey player (born 1992)

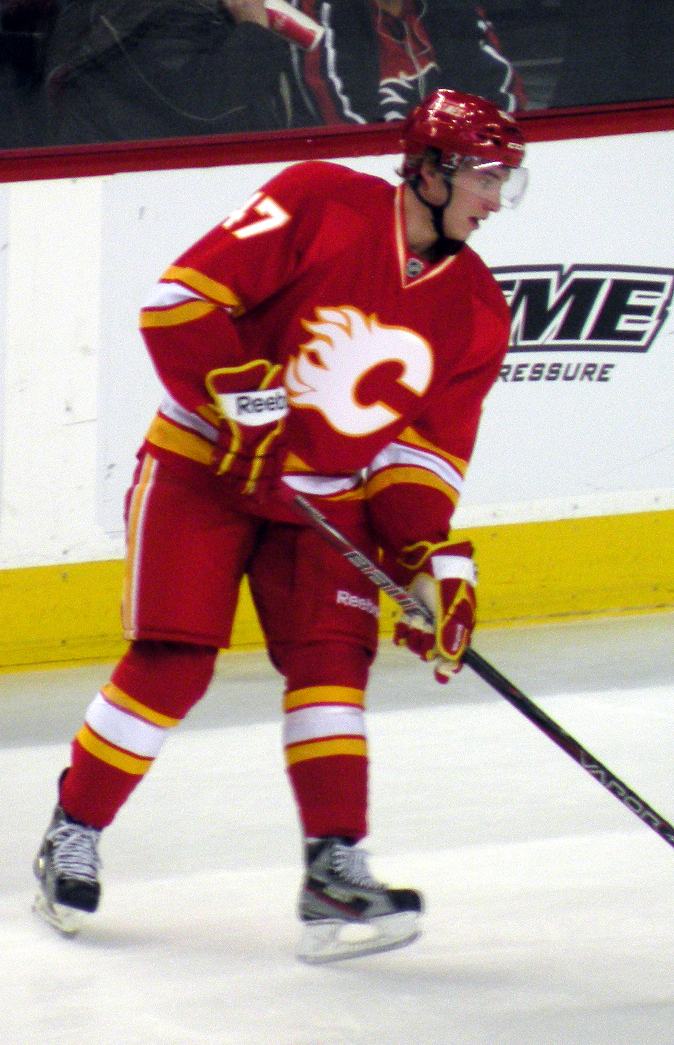
- Bärtschi with the Calgary Flames in 2012
- Born: 5 October 1992 (age 34) Bern, Switzerland
- Height: 5 ft 11 in (180 cm)
- Weight: 192 lb (87 kg; 13 st 10 lb)
- Position: Left wing
- Shot: Left
- Played for: Calgary Flames; Vancouver Canucks; Vegas Golden Knights; SC Bern
- National team: Switzerland
- NHL draft: 13th overall, 2011; Calgary Flames
- Playing career: 2008–2023

Sven Bärtschi (sometimes spelled: Baertschi; born 5 October 1992) is a Swiss former professional ice hockey forward. He played his first professional games in 2009 for SC Langenthal in the National League B before moving to North America to join Portland in the Western Hockey League (WHL), where he finished as the runner-up for the league's Rookie of the Year award. He was selected by the Calgary Flames in the first round, 13th overall, at the 2011 NHL entry draft and made his NHL debut in 2012.

== Playing career ==
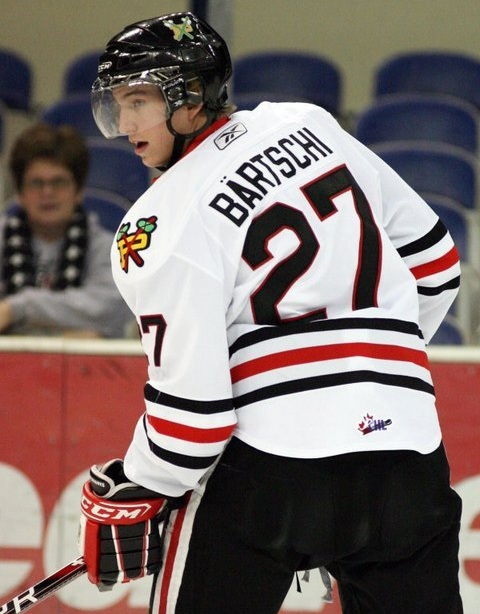
Bärtschi with the Portland Winterhawks in 2011.

Bärtschi began his professional career in 2009–10 for SC Langenthal in the Swiss National League B and was pursued by SC Bern of the National League A. He chose instead to move to North America to pursue an NHL career. He was selected by the Western Hockey League (WHL)'s Portland Winterhawks seventh overall in the 2010 Canadian Hockey League import draft. Bärtschi led all WHL rookies in 2010–11 with 34 goals and 85 points, and finished as the runner-up to Mathew Dumba for the Jim Piggott Memorial Trophy as rookie of the year.

Heading into the 2011 NHL entry draft, Bärtschi was ranked by the NHL Central Scouting Bureau as the seventh best North American based skater, and was selected 13th overall by the Calgary Flames. The team quickly signed him to a three-year entry-level contract US$1.45 million per season, including bonuses. He attended the team's training camp that fall, but was returned to Portland for the 2011–12 WHL season. Bärtschi was among the league's leaders offensively, averaging 2.00 points per game (94 points in 47 games) and was named WHL player of the week three times. His teammates named him Portland's most valuable player, and he was named to the WHL's Western Conference second all-star team.

Due to a number of injuries in Calgary, the Flames recalled Bärtschi on an emergency basis on 7 March. He made his NHL debut on 9 March in a 5–3 victory over the Winnipeg Jets He scored his first goal two nights later against Matt Hackett of the Minnesota Wild. Bärtschi added goals in his following two games and quickly became a fan favourite in Calgary. He appeared in a total of five NHL games and scored three goals before returning players necessitated his return to Portland. Bärtschi was the top scorer of the 2012 WHL playoffs, recording 34 points in 22 games, to lead Portland to their second consecutive appearance in the league championship series. They again lost, falling in seven games to the Edmonton Oil Kings.

Bärtschi turned professional in 2012–13, and due to an NHL labour dispute, began the season with Calgary's American Hockey League (AHL) affiliate, the Abbotsford Heat. He had 17 points in his first 19 games with the Heat before suffering a neck injury that caused him to miss five weeks of the season, a total of 13 games.

On 2 March 2015, the Calgary Flames traded him to the Vancouver Canucks in exchange for Vancouver's 2nd-round draft pick in 2015. Bärtschi had demanded to be traded from the Calgary Flames. Bärtschi made his Canucks debut on 4 April 2015, against the Winnipeg Jets. He initially wore #42 with the Canucks, but changed his number to 47 when the Canucks took on the Arizona Coyotes on 9 April 2015. On 11 April 2015, Sven Bärtschi scored his first and second goals as a Canuck against the Edmonton Oilers. On 28 July 2015, Bärtschi re-signed with the Canucks to a one-year, one-way contract. Bärtschi had a successful season with the Canucks, posting career-highs with 15 goals and 28 points.

On 16 June 2016, Bärtschi re-signed with Vancouver on a 2-year, $3.7 million contract. On 1 July 2018, Bärtschi was signed by the Canucks to a three-year contract extension worth $10.1 million. Bärtschi missed 56 games during the 2018–19 NHL season due to suffering from post-concussion syndrome. He was previously checked in the head by Vegas Golden Knights player Tomas Hyka during a game on 24 October 2018.

On 30 September 2019, Bärtschi was placed on waivers by the Canucks, prior to the start of the 2019–20 NHL season. He cleared waivers the next day.

Following his seventh year within the Canucks organization and not featuring at the NHL level for the 2020–21 season, Bärtschi left as a free agent to sign a one-year, two-way contract with the Vegas Golden Knights on 28 July 2021.

After spending most of the 2021–22 season with Vegas's farm team, the Henderson Silver Knights, Bärtschi returned home to play in Switzerland by signing a three-year deal with SC Bern of the NL. After an unsuccessful first year back in Switzerland, Bärtschi officially retired from professional hockey on 2 August 2023.

== International play ==
Bärtschi has played with the Swiss national junior team on four occasions. He played in the Under-18 world championship in 2009 and 2010, scoring a goal and two assists in both tournaments for Swiss teams that finished in 8th and 5th place respectively. He then appeared with the under-20 team at the 2011 World Junior Ice Hockey Championships, scoring a goal and an assist in another fifth-place finish. He returned for the 2012 tournament, but appeared in only two games before suffering a concussion that forced him out of the event.

== Personal life ==
Bärtschi was born and raised in Langenthal, Switzerland. His father was also a professional hockey player who played in the National League A. His parents divorced when he was 11, after which his mother worked two jobs to allow him and his brother to play hockey.

== Career statistics ==
=== Regular season and playoffs ===
| | | | Regular season | | | | | Playoffs |
| Season | Team | League | GP | G | A | Pts | PIM | GP | G | A | Pts | PIM |
|---|---|---|---|---|---|---|---|---|---|---|---|---|
| 2006–07 | SC Langenthal | SUI U17 | 23 | 34 | 38 | 72 | 26 | — | — | — | — | — |
| 2007–08 | SC Langenthal | SUI U17 | 17 | 16 | 22 | 38 | 22 | — | — | — | — | — |
| 2007–08 | SC Langenthal | SUI U20 | 18 | 3 | 3 | 6 | 4 | — | — | — | — | — |
| 2008–09 | SC Langenthal | SUI U17 | 3 | 4 | 4 | 8 | 0 | — | — | — | — | — |
| 2008–09 | SC Langenthal | SUI U20 | 37 | 21 | 32 | 53 | 40 | — | — | — | — | — |
| 2008–09 | SC Langenthal | NLB | 2 | 0 | 0 | 0 | 0 | — | — | — | — | — |
| 2009–10 | SC Langenthal | SUI.2 U20 | 2 | 3 | 0 | 3 | 2 | — | — | — | — | — |
| 2009–10 | SC Langenthal | NLB | 37 | 6 | 6 | 12 | 8 | 7 | 0 | 3 | 3 | 4 |
| 2009–10 | EV Zug | SUI U20 | 9 | 10 | 13 | 23 | 4 | 2 | 3 | 1 | 4 | 2 |
| 2010–11 | Portland Winterhawks | WHL | 66 | 34 | 51 | 85 | 74 | 21 | 10 | 17 | 27 | 16 |
| 2011–12 | Portland Winterhawks | WHL | 47 | 33 | 61 | 94 | 35 | 22 | 14 | 20 | 34 | 10 |
| 2011–12 | Calgary Flames | NHL | 5 | 3 | 0 | 3 | 4 | — | — | — | — | — |
| 2012–13 | Abbotsford Heat | AHL | 32 | 10 | 16 | 26 | 16 | — | — | — | — | — |
| 2012–13 | Calgary Flames | NHL | 20 | 3 | 7 | 10 | 6 | — | — | — | — | — |
| 2013–14 | Calgary Flames | NHL | 26 | 2 | 9 | 11 | 6 | — | — | — | — | — |
| 2013–14 | Abbotsford Heat | AHL | 41 | 13 | 16 | 29 | 18 | 4 | 0 | 1 | 1 | 6 |
| 2014–15 | Adirondack Flames | AHL | 36 | 8 | 17 | 25 | 6 | — | — | — | — | — |
| 2014–15 | Calgary Flames | NHL | 15 | 0 | 4 | 4 | 6 | — | — | — | — | — |
| 2014–15 | Utica Comets | AHL | 15 | 7 | 8 | 15 | 4 | 21 | 8 | 7 | 15 | 6 |
| 2014–15 | Vancouver Canucks | NHL | 3 | 2 | 0 | 2 | 4 | 2 | 0 | 0 | 0 | 0 |
| 2015–16 | Vancouver Canucks | NHL | 69 | 15 | 13 | 28 | 14 | — | — | — | — | — |
| 2016–17 | Vancouver Canucks | NHL | 68 | 18 | 17 | 35 | 8 | — | — | — | — | — |
| 2017–18 | Vancouver Canucks | NHL | 53 | 14 | 15 | 29 | 20 | — | — | — | — | — |
| 2018–19 | Vancouver Canucks | NHL | 26 | 9 | 5 | 14 | 6 | — | — | — | — | — |
| 2019–20 | Utica Comets | AHL | 43 | 13 | 33 | 46 | 20 | — | — | — | — | — |
| 2019–20 | Vancouver Canucks | NHL | 6 | 0 | 2 | 2 | 4 | — | — | — | — | — |
| 2020–21 | Utica Comets | AHL | 24 | 5 | 9 | 14 | 10 | — | — | — | — | — |
| 2021–22 | Henderson Silver Knights | AHL | 44 | 15 | 13 | 28 | 6 | 2 | 1 | 0 | 1 | 0 |
| 2021–22 | Vegas Golden Knights | NHL | 1 | 0 | 0 | 0 | 0 | — | — | — | — | — |
| 2022–23 | SC Bern | NL | 36 | 4 | 10 | 14 | 6 | — | — | — | — | — |
| NHL totals | | | 292 | 66 | 72 | 138 | 78 | 2 | 0 | 0 | 0 | 0 |

=== International ===
| Year | Team | Event | Result | GP | G | A | Pts | PIM |
|---|---|---|---|---|---|---|---|---|
| 2009 | Switzerland | U18 | 8th | 6 | 1 | 2 | 3 | 2 |
| 2010 | Switzerland | U18 | 5th | 6 | 1 | 2 | 3 | 2 |
| 2011 | Switzerland | WJC | 5th | 6 | 1 | 1 | 2 | 4 |
| 2012 | Switzerland | WJC | 8th | 2 | 0 | 0 | 0 | 0 |
| 2014 | Switzerland | WC | 10th | 1 | 0 | 0 | 0 | 0 |
| Junior totals | | | | 20 | 3 | 5 | 8 | 8 |
| Senior totals | | | | 1 | 0 | 0 | 0 | 0 |

== Awards and honours ==
| Award | Year |
|---|---|
WHL
| West Second All-Star Team | 2011–12 |

Awards and achievements
| Preceded by Tim Erixon | Calgary Flames first-round draft pick 2011 | Succeeded by Mark Jankowski |
