= Cody Beach =

Canadian ice hockey player and referee

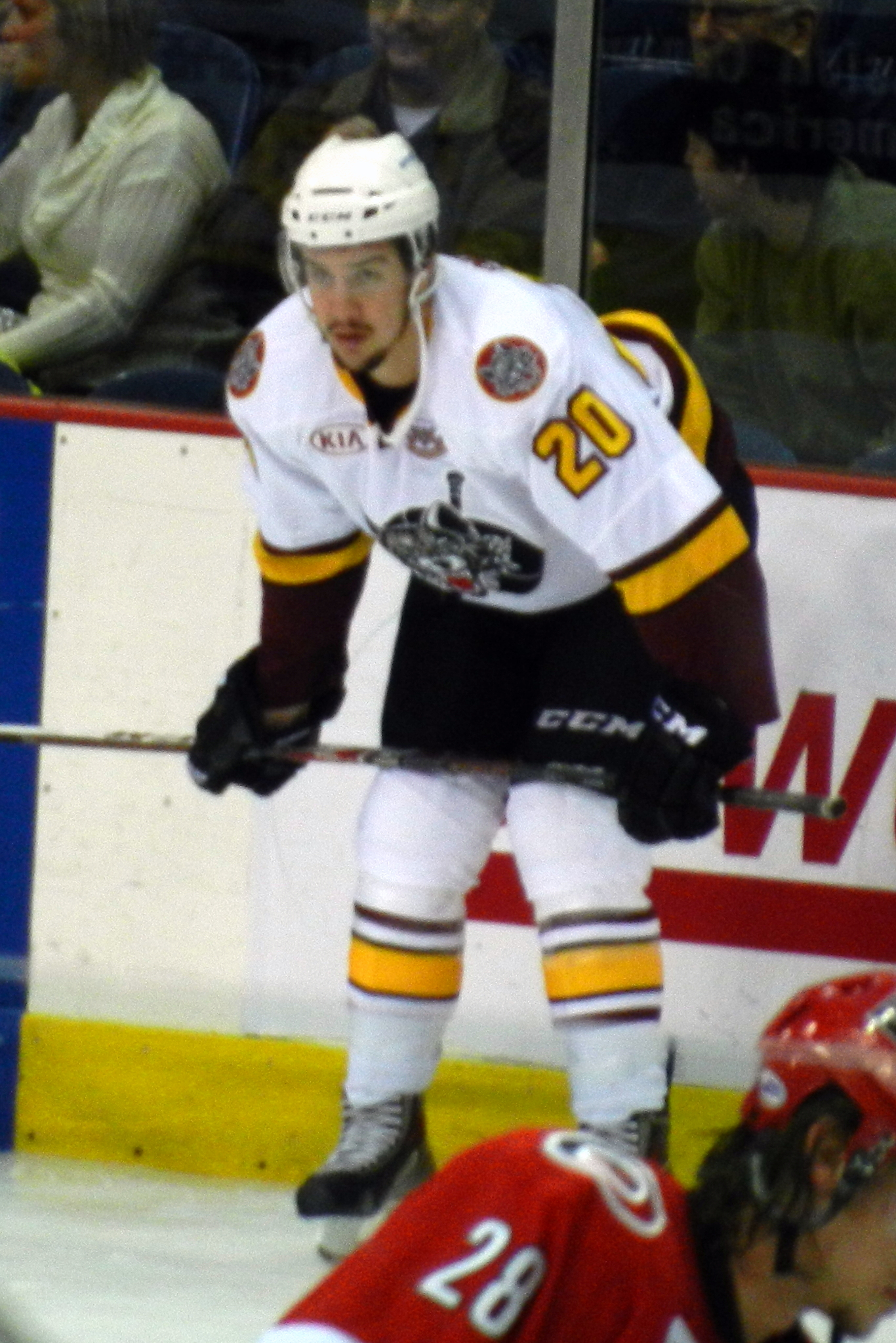
- Beach playing for the Chicago Wolves in 2013
- Born: August 8, 1992 (age 34) Nanaimo, British Columbia, Canada
- Height: 6 ft 5 in (196 cm)
- Weight: 190 lb (86 kg; 13 st 8 lb)
- Position: Forward
- Shot: Right
- Played for: Calgary Hitmen; Moose Jaw Warriors; Chicago Wolves; Kalamazoo Wings; Alaska Aces
- NHL draft: 134th overall, 2010; St. Louis Blues
- Playing career: 2007–2016

Cody Beach is a Canadian former professional ice hockey player and current National Hockey League (NHL) referee.

== Early life ==
Beach was born in Nanaimo and raised in Kelowna. He played hockey in his youth for the Rockets bantam tier one team.

== Professional playing career ==
Beach was selected 58th overall in the 2007 CHL draft by the Calgary Hitmen.

In Beach's 2009-10 WHL rookie season, he fought for the first time in his professional hockey career. In that season, he led all rookies in penalty minutes, earning 157 in 51 games.

Beach was drafted in the fifth round of the 2010 NHL entry draft by the St. Louis Blues.

During the Western Hockey League 2011-12 season, Beach led the league with 229 penalty minutes, maintaining a near point-per-game pace with the Moose Jaw Warriors. In the postseason, he had 10 points and 29 penalty minutes across 13 games. Through Beach's two seasons with Moose Jaw, he posted 21 goals, 90 points, and 392 penalty minutes in 98 games.

Moving up in professional leagues, Beach spent four seasons bouncing between the ECHL and the AHL, playing for the Chicago Wolves, Kalamazoo Wings, and Alaska Aces. Beach retired from playing professional hockey in 2016 at the age of 24 after suffering from the lingering effects of a concussion sustained in the previous season.

== Officiating career ==
After retiring from playing hockey professionally, Beach initially sold farm equipment in Moose Jaw for a few years. Beach was encouraged to try officiating by former WHL referee Shane Smith. Wanting to return to hockey, in 2017, Beach reached out to the director of officiating for the WHL, Kevin Muench, who directed him to the Saskatchewan Hockey Officiating Development Program. Beach officiated in the Saskatchewan Junior Hockey League, Prairie Junior Hockey League and Saskatchewan Midget AAA Hockey League. In 2019, Beach was invited to the WHL Officiating Camp. He also attended the NHL’s Exposure Combine later that year, a program designed for former players to transition into officiating. Beach served as a linesman during the 2019 WHL Cup tournament.

Beach made his pre-season officiating debut in the WHL in 2019, and his regular-season debut in 2020. Al Kimmel, the director of scouting and development for NHL Officiating, scouted a game officiated by Beach that season and decided to invite him back to the Exposure Combine in 2021. After the combine, Beach was signed to a contract that saw him officiate AHL games, with the potential to work for the NHL.

On April 12, 2022, Beach made his NHL officiating debut, working a game between the Arizona Coyotes and the New Jersey Devils.

== Personal life ==
Beach is married to his wife, Keshia. They have two daughters together.

Cody Beach is the brother of former professional hockey player, Kyle Beach.

== See also ==
- List of NHL on-ice officials
