= Mitch Holmberg =

Canadian ice hockey player

- Born: March 9, 1993 (age 32); Sherwood Park, Alberta, Canada
- Height: 5 ft 10 in (178 cm)
- Weight: 175 lb (79 kg; 12 st 7 lb)
- Position: Right wing
- Shot: Right
- Played for: Oklahoma City Barons; Alba Volán Székesfehérvár II; Wheeling Nailers
- NHL draft: Undrafted
- Playing career: 2014–2017

Mitch Holmberg (born March 9, 1993) is a Canadian former ice hockey player. He played most recently for the Wheeling Nailers of the ECHL in the 2016-2017 season.

== Playing career ==
Holmberg played midget hockey with the Sherwood Park Kings in the Alberta Midget Hockey League before he was selected by the Spokane Chiefs in the first round (21st overall) of the 2008 WHL Bantam Draft. After completing his junior eligibility with the Chiefs in the Western Hockey League, Holmberg was signed to an AHL contract for the following 2014–15 season with the Oklahoma City Barons on April 1, 2014. He made his professional debut a day later with the Barons and on April 4 finished his season in the playoffs with ECHL affiliate, the Bakersfield Condors.

On November 20, 2014, Holmberg's AHL rights were traded to the Utica Comets in a transaction between the Vancouver Canucks and Edmonton Oilers. He was later re-assigned by the Comets to ECHL club, the Elmira Jackals for the remainder of the 2014–15 season.

As a free agent, Holmberg signed his first contract abroad, agreeing to a one-year deal with the farm club of Hungarian based, Alba Volán Székesfehérvár on August 24, 2015. After a season in the MOL Liga, Holmberg was unable to debut in the top-flight Székesfehérvár club and opted to return to the ECHL as a free agent in the off-season, signing a one-year deal with the Wichita Thunder on July 28, 2016. In the 2016–17 season, Holmberg contributed with 7 points in 13 games with the Thunder before he was traded to the Colorado Eagles on December 18, 2016. Amongst the Eagles top nine forwards, Holmberg added a further 8 goals in 28 games before he was dealt for a second time within the season, to the Wheeling Nailers on March 9, 2017.

== Career statistics ==
=== Regular season and playoffs ===
			Regular season					Playoffs
Season	Team	League	GP	G	A	Pts	PIM	GP	G	A	Pts	PIM
2008–09	Sherwood Park Kings	AMHL	31	21	20	41	29	—	—	—	—	—
2009–10	Spokane Chiefs	WHL	52	4	6	10	2	4	0	0	0	0
2010–11	Spokane Chiefs	WHL	58	15	18	33	12	11	6	1	7	0
2011–12	Spokane Chiefs	WHL	66	27	28	55	8	13	11	3	14	2
2012–13	Spokane Chiefs	WHL	66	39	41	80	22	9	3	4	7	4
2013–14	Spokane Chiefs	WHL	72	62	56	118	25	4	0	1	1	4
2013–14	Oklahoma City Barons	AHL	1	0	1	1	0	—	—	—	—	—
2013–14	Bakersfield Condors	ECHL	—	—	—	—	—	3	0	0	0	0
2014–15	Bakersfield Condors	ECHL	8	0	1	1	0	—	—	—	—	—
2014–15	Elmira Jackals	ECHL	32	6	8	14	6	—	—	—	—	—
2015–16	Alba Volán Székesfehérvár II	MOL	48	37	31	68	2	9	6	11	17	0
2016–17	Wichita Thunder	ECHL	13	3	4	7	2	—	—	—	—	—
2016–17	Colorado Eagles	ECHL	28	8	4	12	4	—	—	—	—	—
2016–17	Wheeling Nailers	ECHL	9	0	0	0	0	—	—	—	—	—
WHL totals			314	147	149	296	69	37	20	8	28	6

=== International ===
Year	Team	Event	Result	GP	G	A	Pts	PIM
2010	Canada Pacific	U17	5th	5	1	3	4	2
Junior totals				5	1	3	4	2

== Awards and honors ==
Honors	Year
Bob Clarke Trophy – WHL top scorer	2013–14
WHL First All-Star Team (West)	2013–14
