= Tyler Bunz =

Canadian ice hockey goaltender (born 1992)

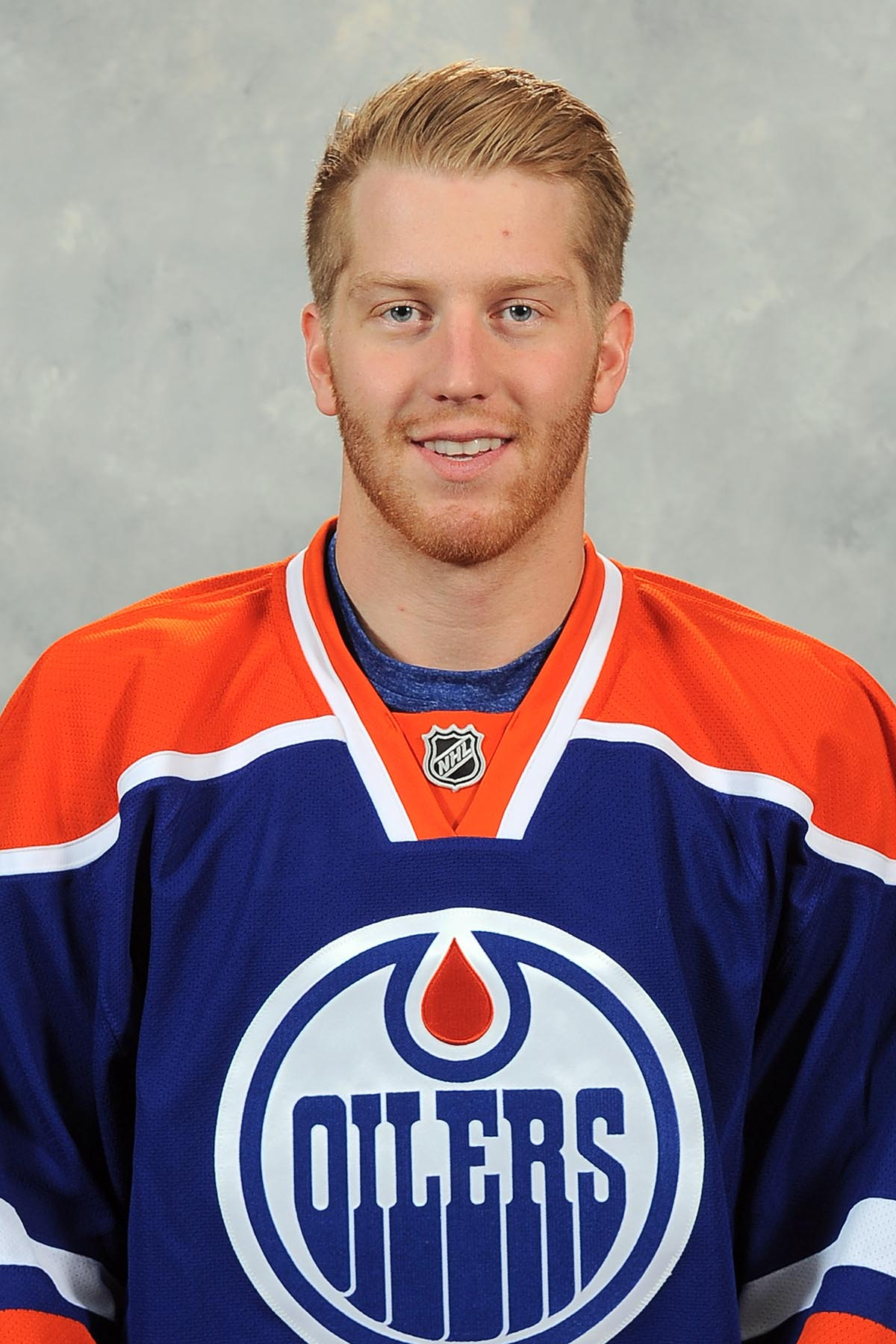
- Bunz with the Edmonton Oilers in 2014
- Born: February 11, 1992 (age 34) St. Albert, Alberta, Canada
- Height: 6 ft 1 in (185 cm)
- Weight: 205 lb (93 kg; 14 st 9 lb)
- Position: Goaltender
- Caught: Left
- Played for: Edmonton Oilers
- NHL draft: 121st overall, 2010; Edmonton Oilers
- Playing career: 2012–2015

Tyler Bunz (born February 11, 1992) is a Canadian former professional ice hockey goaltender who last played as a prospect within the Edmonton Oilers organization of the National Hockey League (NHL). Bunz was selected by the Edmonton Oilers in the 5th round (121st overall) of the 2010 NHL entry draft.

On March 19, 2012, the Oilers signed Bunz to a three-year entry-level contract.

On March 22, 2014, Bunz was hit in the throat by a puck, leading to a life-threatening injury. He recovered from his injury without needing surgery and resumed his playing career.

In the 2014–15 season, on April 2, 2015, Bunz made his NHL debut against the Los Angeles Kings. He substituted in for Ben Scrivens, who had given up 5 goals, to start the third period. Bunz surrendered 3 goals on 12 shots and the Kings routed the Oilers 8–2.

== Career statistics ==
			Regular season									Playoffs
Season	Team	League	GP	W	L	T/OT	MIN	GA	SO	GAA	SV%	GP	W	L	MIN	GA	SO	GAA	SV%
2007–08	Medicine Hat Tigers	WHL	1	1	0	0	60	3	1	3.00	.885	—	—	—	—	—	—	—	—
2008–09	Medicine Hat Tigers	WHL	22	9	6	1	1007	58	0	3.46	.886	2	0	1	82	6	0	4.93	.887
2009–10	Medicine Hat Tigers	WHL	57	31	19	5	3214	156	2	2.91	.898	12	6	5	720	35	0	2.92	.899
2010–11	Medicine Hat Tigers	WHL	56	35	13	8	3350	138	3	2.47	.919	10	4	6	566	28	1	2.97	.912
2011–12	Medicine Hat Tigers	WHL	61	39	17	5	3616	155	3	2.57	.921	8	4	4	496	23	1	2.78	.925
2012–13	Stockton Thunder	ECHL	37	16	16	4	2130	119	1	3.35	.886	4	1	1	178	9	0	3.03	.899
2012–13	Oklahoma City Barons	AHL	1	0	0	0	25	5	0	10.56	.667	—	—	—	—	—	—	—	—
2013–14	Bakersfield Condors	ECHL	13	5	2	3	660	28	0	2.55	.903	—	—	—	—	—	—	—	—
2013–14	Oklahoma City Barons	AHL	5	2	1	1	232	14	0	3.63	.901	—	—	—	—	—	—	—	—
2014–15	Wichita Thunder	ECHL	17	6	10	1	1009	50	2	2.97	.890	—	—	—	—	—	—	—	—
2014–15	Oklahoma City Barons	AHL	2	0	0	0	60	5	0	5.00	.839	—	—	—	—	—	—	—	—
2014–15	Edmonton Oilers	NHL	1	0	0	0	20	3	0	9.00	.750	—	—	—	—	—	—	—	—
NHL totals			1	0	0	0	20	3	0	9.00	.750	—	—	—	—	—	—	—	—

== Awards and honours ==
Award	Year
WHL East Second All-Star Team	2010–11
WHL East First All-Star Team	2011–12
Del Wilson Trophy – WHL Goaltender of the Year	2011–12

== See also ==
- List of players who played only one game in the NHL

Preceded by Darcy Kuemper	Winner of the WHL Del Wilson Trophy; 2011–12	Succeeded by Patrik Bartosak
