= Darren Kramer =

Canadian ice hockey player

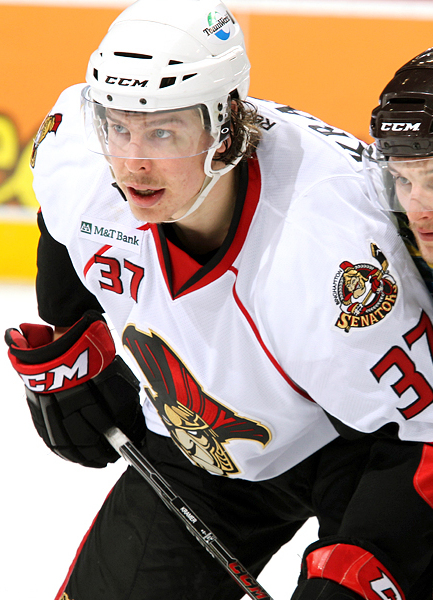
- Kramer with the Binghamton Senators in 2013
- Born: November 19, 1991 (age 34) Peace River, Alberta, Canada
- Height: 6 ft 01 in (185 cm)
- Weight: 210 lb (95 kg; 15 st 0 lb)
- Position: Left wing
- Shot: Left
- Played for: Binghamton Senators; Manitoba Moose
- NHL draft: 156th overall, 2011; Ottawa Senators
- Playing career: 2012–2018

Darren Kramer (born November 19, 1991) is a Canadian former professional ice hockey forward who played in the American Hockey League (AHL). He was drafted 156th overall by the Ottawa Senators in 2011 NHL entry draft.

== Playing career ==
Kramer started his junior hockey career with the Grande Prairie Storm (Alberta Junior Hockey League) before joining the Spokane Chiefs of the Western Hockey League in 2010. Known as an enforcer, he led the WHL in penalty minutes in 2010–11 and finished second the following season.

The Ottawa Senators selected Kramer 156th overall in the 6th round of the 2011 National Hockey League Entry Draft. After finishing junior hockey, Kramer signed a three-year entry-level contract with the Senators and joined their AHL affiliate, the Binghamton Senators, where he scored 22 points and earned 545 penalty minutes in 136 games between 2012 and 2015. The Senators did not tender Kramer a qualifying offer following the 2014–15 season, making him an unrestricted free agent. Kramer joined the Manitoba Moose in July 2015 on a professional tryout contract and later signed a one-year contract with the club. The Moose re-signed Kramer to one-year contracts during the summers of 2016 and 2017.

In the 2017–18 season, Kramer served as an alternate captain while in his third season with the Manitoba Moose. He registered 3 goals in just 26 games. On May 17, 2018, Kramer announced his retirement from his 6-year professional hockey career.

== Career statistics ==
			Regular season					Playoffs
Season	Team	League	GP	G	A	Pts	PIM	GP	G	A	Pts	PIM
2008-09	Grande Prairie Storm	AJHL	38	4	0	4	220	14	1	0	1	45
2009-10	Grande Prairie Storm	AJHL	58	19	11	30	311	9	2	2	4	23
2010–11	Spokane Chiefs	WHL	68	8	6	14	306	17	5	3	8	21
2011–12	Spokane Chiefs	WHL	71	22	18	40	200	12	3	3	6	20
2012–13	Elmira Jackals	ECHL	19	3	7	10	127	—	—	—	—	—
2012–13	Binghamton Senators	AHL	21	1	0	1	83	—	—	—	—	—
2013–14	Binghamton Senators	AHL	45	2	2	4	178	3	0	0	0	3
2014–15	Binghamton Senators	AHL	70	5	12	17	284	—	—	—	—	—
2015–16	Manitoba Moose	AHL	61	7	5	12	138	—	—	—	—	—
2016–17	Manitoba Moose	AHL	42	3	1	4	89	—	—	—	—	—
2017–18	Manitoba Moose	AHL	26	3	0	3	47	—	—	—	—	—
AHL totals			265	21	20	41	819	3	0	0	0	2
