= Keegan Lowe =

American-born Canadian ice hockey player

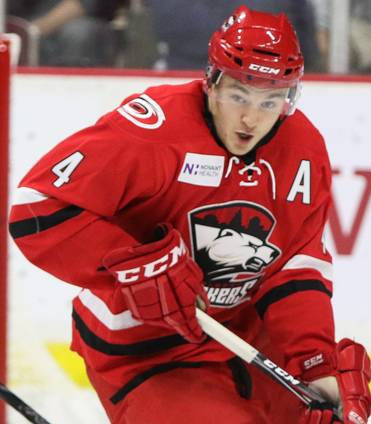
- Lowe with the Charlotte Checkers in 2015
- Born: March 29, 1993 (age 33) Greenwich, Connecticut, U.S.
- Height: 6 ft 1 in (185 cm)
- Weight: 200 lb (91 kg; 14 st 4 lb)
- Position: Defence
- Shoots: Left
- SHL team Former teams: Växjö Lakers; Carolina Hurricanes; Edmonton Oilers; HC Bolzano
- NHL draft: 73rd overall, 2011; Carolina Hurricanes
- Playing career: 2013–present

Keegan Lowe (born March 29, 1993) is an American-born Canadian professional ice hockey defenceman for Växjö Lakers of the Swedish Hockey League (SHL). Lowe was selected by the Carolina Hurricanes in the third round (73rd overall) of the 2011 NHL entry draft and has played in four games in the National Hockey League (NHL) between the Hurricanes and the Edmonton Oilers. He is the son of longtime Oilers executive and former player Kevin Lowe and Olympic bronze medalist Karen Percy.

== Playing career ==
As a youth, Lowe played in the 2006 Quebec International Pee-Wee Hockey Tournament with the Edmonton Oilers minor ice hockey team.

On March 13, 2013, the Carolina Hurricanes of the National Hockey League (NHL) signed Lowe to a three-year, entry-level contract. He made his NHL debut on April 9, 2015, during which he racked up 10 penalty minutes for two separate fights against NHL veteran Vincent Lecavalier.

In his fourth year within the Hurricanes organization, Lowe collected three goals and 12 points in 49 games during the 2016–17 season, before he was traded by Carolina to the Montreal Canadiens in exchange for Philip Samuelsson on February 21, 2017.

On July 1, 2017, Lowe was signed to a one-year, two-way deal with the Edmonton Oilers. He later signed a two-year contract with the Oilers on June 3, 2018.

Following three seasons within the Oilers organization, Lowe left the club as a free agent. Entering the delayed 2020–21 season, Lowe opted to continue his career in the American Hockey League (AHL), securing a one-year contract with the San Diego Gulls, the primary affiliate to the Anaheim Ducks, on January 11, 2021. In 44 regular season games as an alternate captain with the Gulls, Lowe added two goals and six points from the blueline.

As a free agent following his lone season with the San Diego Gulls, Lowe embarked on a European career, agreeing to a one-year contract with Italian-based club HC Bolzano of the ICE Hockey League on August 18, 2021.

After the season and his contract with Bolzano, Lowe continued his career abroad by signing a one-year deal for the 2022–23 season with Växjö Lakers of the Swedish Hockey League (SHL) on July 23, 2022.

On April 20, 2025, Lowe signed a two-year contract extension with the Lakers to keep him in Växjö through the 2026-27 season.

== Career statistics ==
			Regular season					Playoffs
Season	Team	League	GP	G	A	Pts	PIM	GP	G	A	Pts	PIM
2009–10	Edmonton Oil Kings	WHL	69	2	12	14	60	—	—	—	—	—
2010–11	Edmonton Oil Kings	WHL	71	2	22	24	123	4	1	0	1	4
2011–12	Edmonton Oil Kings	WHL	72	3	20	23	139	20	3	4	7	44
2012–13	Edmonton Oil Kings	WHL	64	15	16	31	148	22	1	7	8	28
2013–14	Charlotte Checkers	AHL	63	2	10	12	86	—	—	—	—	—
2014–15	Charlotte Checkers	AHL	58	2	9	11	106	—	—	—	—	—
2014–15	Carolina Hurricanes	NHL	2	0	0	0	10	—	—	—	—	—
2015–16	Charlotte Checkers	AHL	67	3	11	14	75	—	—	—	—	—
2016–17	Charlotte Checkers	AHL	49	3	9	12	53	—	—	—	—	—
2016–17	St. John's IceCaps	AHL	22	3	3	6	21	3	0	0	0	0
2017–18	Bakersfield Condors	AHL	52	2	12	14	65	—	—	—	—	—
2017–18	Edmonton Oilers	NHL	2	0	0	0	0	—	—	—	—	—
2018–19	Bakersfield Condors	AHL	67	0	20	20	66	10	1	5	6	17
2019–20	Bakersfield Condors	AHL	56	1	6	7	58	—	—	—	—	—
2020–21	San Diego Gulls	AHL	44	2	4	6	33	3	0	0	0	2
2021–22	HC Bolzano	ICEHL	44	4	16	20	45	2	0	0	0	2
2022–23	Växjö Lakers	SHL	51	3	8	11	12	18	2	2	4	18
2023–24	Växjö Lakers	SHL	46	3	9	12	54	8	1	1	2	27
2024–25	Växjö Lakers	SHL	37	1	6	7	30	8	1	3	4	6
NHL totals			4	0	0	0	10	—	—	—	—	—
SHL totals			134	7	23	30	96	34	4	6	10	51

== Awards and honours ==
Awards	Year
WHL
East Second All-Star Team	2013
SHL
Le Mat Trophy	2023
