= James Bettauer =

Canadian-German ice hockey player

- Born: March 19, 1991 (age 35) Burnaby, British Columbia, Canada
- Height: 6 ft 2 in (188 cm)
- Weight: 180 lb (82 kg; 12 st 12 lb)
- Position: Defence
- Shoots: Right
- DEL2 team Former teams: Ravensburg Towerstars; Hamburg Freezers; Augsburger Panther; Straubing Tigers; Krefeld Pinguine; Sheffield Steelers
- NHL draft: Undrafted
- Playing career: 2012–present

James Bettauer (born March 19, 1991) is a Canadian-German professional ice hockey player who currently plays for the Ravensburg Towerstars in the German DEL2. Bettauer was previously with the Sheffield Steelers of the Elite Ice Hockey League (EIHL).

== Playing career ==
Bettauer moved to Hamburg Freezers in 2012, after playing junior hockey in the Western Hockey League for Medicine Hat Tigers and Prince Albert Raiders. Bettauer scored 10 points in his first season with the Freezers, helping them to a 5th-place finish and a place in the play-offs.

After completing his second season with the Freezers, Bettauer left as a free agent and signed a one-year contract with DEL rivals the Augsburger Panther on April 15, 2014. In March 2015, he had his contract renewed for the 2015–16 season. In March 2016, he was signed by another DEL team, the Straubing Tigers.

In July 2019, Bettauer agreed to a move to the UK EIHL where he signed with the Sheffield Steelers on a two-year deal, while also accepting a two-year tenured MBA package at the University of Sheffield.

Despite initially agreeing to return to Sheffield for a second season, the indefinite suspension of the 2020-21 Elite League season due to ongoing coronavirus restrictions saw Bettauer instead sign for German DEL2 side Ravensburg Towerstars.

== Personal life ==
His father comes from Berlin, Germany.

== Career statistics ==
			Regular season					Playoffs
Season	Team	League	GP	G	A	Pts	PIM	GP	G	A	Pts	PIM
2007–08	Penticton Vees	BCHL	42	0	3	3	16	1	0	0	0	0
2008–09	Chilliwack Bruins	WHL	68	1	6	7	21	—	—	—	—	—
2009–10	Burnaby Express	BCHL	33	7	16	23	59	—	—	—	—	—
2010–11	Prince Albert Raiders	WHL	70	5	18	23	62	6	0	2	2	4
2011–12	Prince Albert Raiders	WHL	15	5	4	9	10	—	—	—	—	—
2011–12	Medicine Hat Tigers	WHL	59	16	33	49	20	8	4	2	6	2
2012–13	Hamburg Freezers	DEL	39	5	5	10	6	4	0	0	0	0
2013–14	Hamburg Freezers	DEL	50	3	4	7	42	12	1	1	2	0
2014–15	Augsburger Panther	DEL	50	9	17	26	68	—	—	—	—	—
2015–16	Augsburger Panther	DEL	52	3	12	15	26	—	—	—	—	—
2016–17	Straubing Tigers	DEL	48	10	4	14	28	2	0	2	2	0
2017–18	Straubing Tigers	DEL	45	5	11	16	18	—	—	—	—	—
2018–19	Krefeld Pinguine	DEL	49	5	12	17	40	—	—	—	—	—
2019–20	Sheffield Steelers	EIHL	27	4	3	7	12	—	—	—	—	—
2020–21	Ravensburg Towerstars	DEL2	30	15	15	30	16	7	1	2	3	8
DEL totals			333	40	65	105	228	18	1	3	4	0
