= Tyler Maxwell =

American ice hockey player

- Born: April 13, 1991 (age 35) Manhattan Beach, California, U.S.
- Height: 5 ft 9 in (175 cm)
- Weight: 185 lb (84 kg; 13 st 3 lb)
- Position: Centre
- Shot: Left
- Played for: EC Red Bull Salzburg; Utah Grizzlies; Bakersfield Condors; Ontario Reign; HC Valpellice; Stockton Thunder; Alaska Aces
- NHL draft: Undrafted
- Playing career: 2012–2016

Tyler Maxwell (born April 13, 1991) is an American former professional ice hockey player. Maxwell was born in Manhattan Beach, California. He has not played since the 2015-16 ECHL season with the Toledo Walleye, also playing with the Alaska Aces (ECHL) earlier in the season.

== Playing career ==
Maxwell played major junior hockey in the Western Hockey League for the Everett Silvertips. He made his professional debut in the Austrian Hockey League playing with EC Red Bull Salzburg during the 2012–13 Austrian Hockey League season.

On June 23, 2014, after a successful season with HC Valpellice in the Italian Elite.A, Maxwell returned to the ECHL to sign a one-year contract with the Stockton Thunder.

On September 24, 2015, Maxwell's rights were traded from the Thunder organization to the Alaska Aces prior to the 2015–16 season.

== Personal ==
He is separated at this time to Chanel Maxwell after his arrest for domestic violence . Tyler pled guilty to the charge of abusing his wife and currently has a restraining order against him.Tyler and Chanel also have a son named Ryder and two daughters named Ivy and Everly, he has a sister Hyland. His mother Marcee Katz and his father Aaron Maxwell have been a huge support throughout his hockey career

== See also ==
- List of select Jewish ice hockey players
