= 2014 Calder Cup playoffs =

North American ice hockey tournament

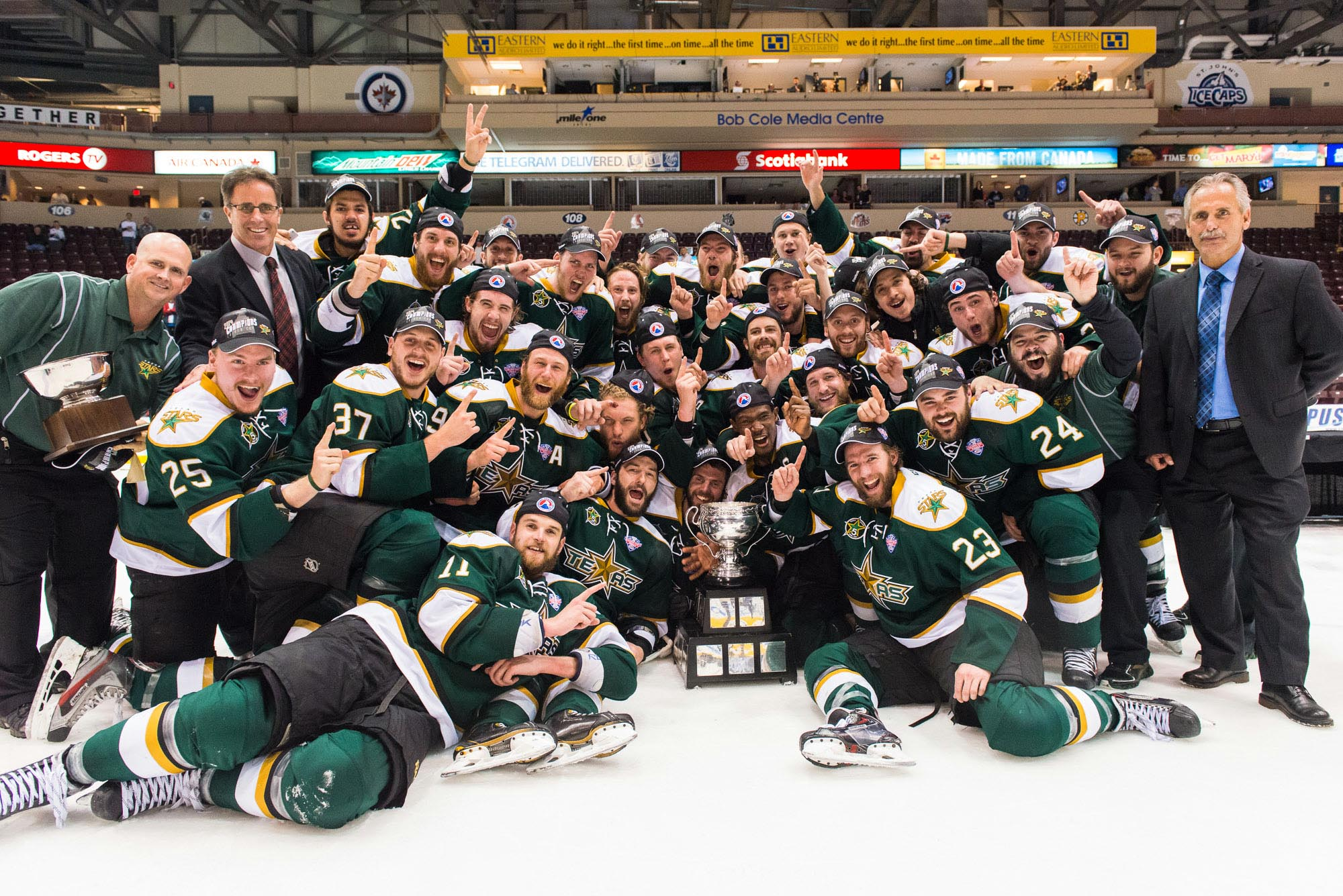
- The champion Texas Stars

Tournament details
- Dates: April 23 – June 17, 2014
- Teams: 16

Final positions
- Champions: Texas Stars
- Runners-up: St. John's IceCaps

Tournament statistics
- Scoring leader(s): Travis Morin (Stars) (22 points)

Awards
- MVP: Travis Morin (Stars)

The 2014 Calder Cup playoffs of the American Hockey League began on April 23, 2014, with the same playoff format that was introduced in 2012. The sixteen teams that qualified, eight from each conference, will play best-of-five series in the conference quarterfinals, with the playoffs to continue with best-of-seven series for the conference semi-finals, conference finals, and Calder Cup finals. The Texas Stars defeated the St. John's IceCaps in five games to win the Calder Cup for the first time in Texas Stars' franchise history.

== Playoff seeds ==
After the 2013–14 AHL regular season, 16 teams qualified for the playoffs. The top eight teams from each conference qualifies for the playoffs.

=== Eastern Conference ===
==== Atlantic Division ====
1. Manchester Monarchs – 105 points
2. St. John's IceCaps – 99 points
3. Providence Bruins – 91 points

==== Northeast Division ====
1. Springfield Falcons – 100 points
2. Albany Devils – 93 Points

==== East Division ====
1. Binghamton Senators – 96 points
2. Wilkes-Barre/Scranton Penguins – 92 points
3. Norfolk Admirals – 90 points

=== Western Conference ===
==== West Division ====
1. Texas Stars – 106 points
2. Abbotsford Heat – 94 points
3. Oklahoma City Barons – 83 points

==== Midwest Division ====
1. Chicago Wolves – 100 points
2. Grand Rapids Griffins – 99 points
3. Milwaukee Admirals – 91 points

==== North Division ====
1. Toronto Marlies – 96 points
2. Rochester Americans – 85 points

== Bracket ==
Conference quarterfinals	Conference semifinals
1	Manchester	1
8	Norfolk	3
4	St. John's	4
8	Norfolk	2
2	Springfield	2
7	Providence	3
Eastern Conference
3	Binghamton	1
6	Wilkes-Barre/Scranton	3
6	Wilkes-Barre/Scranton	4
7	Providence	3
4	St. John's	3
5	Albany	1
1	Texas	3
8	Oklahoma City	0
1	Texas	4
4	Grand Rapids	2
2	Chicago	3
7	Rochester	2
Western Conference
3	Toronto	3
6	Milwaukee	0
2	Chicago	0
3	Toronto	4
4	Grand Rapids	3
5	Abbotsford	1

Conference finals
4	St. John's	4
6	Wilkes-Barre/Scranton	2
1	Texas	4
3	Toronto	3

Calder Cup Final
E4	St. John's	1
W1	Texas	4

== Conference quarterfinals ==
Note 1: All times are in Eastern Time (UTC-4).
Note 2: Game times in italics signify games to be played only if necessary.
Note 3: Home team is listed first.

=== Eastern Conference ===
==== (1) Manchester Monarchs vs. (8) Norfolk Admirals ====
April 25	Manchester Monarchs	2 – 0	Norfolk Admirals	Verizon Wireless Arena	Recap
Sean Backman 1 - 11:38		First period	No scoring
No scoring		Second period	No scoring
Zach O'Brien 1 - 18:40		Third period	No scoring
Jean-Francois Berube 30 saves / 30 shots		Goalie stats	John Gibson 24 saves / 26 shots

April 26	Manchester Monarchs	2 – 3	Norfolk Admirals	Verizon Wireless Arena	Recap
Nic Dowd 1 - 16:34; Zach O'Brien 2 - 17:51		First period	No scoring
No scoring		Second period	7:54 - pp - Max Friberg 1; 11:56 - Dave Steckel 1
No scoring		Third period	11:17 - William Karlsson 1
Jean-Francois Berube 24 saves / 27 shots		Goalie stats	John Gibson 32 saves / 34 shots

April 30	Norfolk Admirals	1 – 0	OT	Manchester Monarchs	Norfolk Scope	Recap
No scoring		First period		No scoring
No scoring		Second period		No scoring
No scoring		Third period		No scoring
Maxime Sauve 1 - 14:51		First overtime period		No scoring
John Gibson 35 saves / 35 shots		Goalie stats		Jean-Francois Berube 30 saves / 31 shots

May 2	Norfolk Admirals	3 – 2	Manchester Monarchs	Norfolk Scope	Recap
Nic Kerdiles 1 - 3:25		First period	No scoring
No scoring		Second period	15:56 - pp - Andy Andreoff 1
Chris Wagner 1 - 2:12; Maxime Sauve 2 - 10:49		Third period	4:29 - Andrew Campbell 1
John Gibson 17 saves / 19 shots		Goalie stats	Jean-Francois Berube 19 saves / 22 shots

Norfolk wins series 3–1

==== (2) Springfield Falcons vs. (7) Providence Bruins ====
April 23	Providence Bruins	2 – 3	OT	Springfield Falcons	Dunkin' Donuts Center	Recap
David Warsofsky 1 - pp - 13:41		First period		No scoring
No scoring		Second period		2:46 - Jean-Francois Jacques 1; 16:14 - Ryan Craig 1
Ryan Spooner 1 - 7:43		Third period		No scoring
No scoring		First overtime period		2:21 - Andrew Joudrey 1
Niklas Svedberg 31 saves / 34 shots		Goalie stats		Mike McKenna 35 saves / 37 shots

April 25	Springfield Falcons	1 – 2	OT	Providence Bruins	MassMutual Center	Recap
No scoring		First period		7:29 - Blake Parlett 1
Michael Chaput 1 - 4:43		Second period		No scoring
No scoring		Third period		No scoring
No scoring		First overtime period		3:54 - Matt Fraser 1
Mike McKenna 34 saves / 36 shots		Goalie stats		Niklas Svedberg 23 saves / 24 shots

April 26	Springfield Falcons	3 – 2	Providence Bruins	MassMutual Center	Recap
No scoring		First period	No scoring
Carter Camper 1 - pp - 15:23		Second period	10:37 - Matt Lindblad 1
Jake Hansen 1 - 2:32; Dana Tyrell 1 - sh - 17:25		Third period	18:19 - pp - Matt Lindblad 2
Mike McKenna 42 saves / 44 shots		Goalie stats	Niklas Svedberg 22 saves / 25 shots

April 29	Providence Bruins	6 – 3	Springfield Falcons	Dunkin' Donuts Center	Recap
Craig Cunningham 1 - 7:04; Matt Fraser 2 - 8:54; Ryan Spooner 2 - pp - 19:56		First period	13:00 - pp - Ryan Craig 2
Nick Johnson 1 - 13:59		Second period	13:53 - pp - Darryl Boyce 1
Matt Fraser 3 - 4:45; Alexander Khokhlachev 1 - pp - 8:30		Third period	17:24 - pp - Tim Erixon 1
Malcolm Subban 31 saves / 34 shots		Goalie stats	Mike McKenna 23 saves / 28 shots Anton Forsberg 9 saves / 10 shots

May 3	Springfield Falcons	3 – 6	Providence Bruins	MassMutual Center	Recap
Michael Chaput 2 - 4:27; Ryan Craig 3 - pp - 9:56; Ryan Craig 4 - 11:01		First period	8:59 - Joe Morrow 1; 11:55 - Seth Griffith 1; 13:33 - Seth Griffith 2; 16:14 - Alexander Khokhlachev 2
No scoring		Second period	13:06 - Matt Lindblad 3
No scoring		Third period	18:55 - en - Ryan Spooner 3
Mike McKenna 3 saves / 6 shots Anton Forsberg 24 saves / 26 shots		Goalie stats	Malcolm Subban 5 saves / 7 shots Niklas Svedberg 20 saves / 21 shots

Providence wins series 3–2

==== (3) Binghamton Senators vs. (6) Wilkes-Barre/Scranton Penguins ====
April 25	Binghamton Senators	2 – 3	OT	Wilkes-Barre/Scranton Penguins	Broome County Veterans Memorial Arena	Recap
Cody Ceci 1 - pp - 6:06		First period		No scoring
Jean-Gabriel Pageau 1 - 14:44		Second period		12:23 - Harry Zolnierczyk 1; 17:57 - sh - Andrew Ebbett 1
No scoring		Third period		No scoring
No scoring		First overtime period		8:40 - Anton Zlobin 1
Andrew Hammond 34 saves / 37 shots		Goalie stats		Peter Mannino 27 saves / 29 shots

April 26	Binghamton Senators	4 – 3	OT	Wilkes-Barre/Scranton Penguins	Broome County Veterans Memorial Arena	Recap
Chris Wideman 1 - pp - 9:09		First period		4:51 - Chuck Kobasew 1; 11:03 - Tom Kostopoulos 1
Stephane Da Costa 1 - pp - 16:34		Second period		1:58 - Mike Carman 1
Mark Stone 1 - 0:23		Third period		No scoring
Stephane Da Costa 2 - 11:07		First overtime period		No scoring
Andrew Hammond 23 saves / 26 shots		Goalie stats		Peter Mannino 24 saves / 28 shots

April 30	Wilkes-Barre/Scranton Penguins	3 – 2	OT	Binghamton Senators	Mohegan Sun Arena at Casey Plaza	Recap
Nick Drazenovic 1 - pp - 7:32		First period		7:53 - sh - Corey Cowick 1
Adam Payerl 1 - 16:37		Second period		No scoring
No scoring		Third period		10:58 - Jim O'Brien 1
Chuck Kobasew 2 - 7:32		First overtime period		No scoring
Peter Mannino 20 saves / 22 shots		Goalie stats		Andrew Hammond 30 saves / 33 shots

May 2	Wilkes-Barre/Scranton Penguins	5 – 1	Binghamton Senators	Mohegan Sun Arena at Casey Plaza	Recap
Chuck Kobasew 3 - pp - 11:38		First period	No scoring
Brian Dumoulin 1 - pp - 1:19; Dominik Uher 1 - 9:01; Andrew Ebbett 2 - 17:07		Second period	No scoring
Harry Zolnierczyk 2 - en - 17:53		Third period	3:50 - pp - Shane Prince 1
Peter Mannino 26 saves / 27 shots		Goalie stats	Andrew Hammond 19 saves / 23 shots

Wilkes-Barre/Scranton wins series 3–1

==== (4) St. John's IceCaps vs. (5) Albany Devils ====
April 25	Albany Devils	1 – 2	St. John's IceCaps	Times Union Center	Recap
No scoring		First period	4:29 - Eric O'Dell 1
Joe Whitney 1 - pp - 2:13		Second period	No scoring
No scoring		Third period	19:36 - Ben Chiarot 1
Keith Kinkaid 30 saves / 32 shots		Goalie stats	Michael Hutchinson 25 saves / 26 shots

April 26	Albany Devils	4 – 2	St. John's IceCaps	Times Union Center	Recap
Reid Boucher 1 - 11:09; Stefan Matteau 1 - pp - 16:56		First period	10:10 - Brenden Kichton 1
Mattias Tedenby 1 - pp - 8:08		Second period	5:11 - pp - Brenden Kichton 2
Scott Timmins 1 - pp - 10:01		Third period	No scoring
Keith Kinkaid 30 saves / 32 shots		Goalie stats	Michael Hutchinson 30 saves / 34 shots

April 30	St. John's IceCaps	1 – 0	Albany Devils	Mile One Centre	Recap
Kael Mouillierat 1 - 17:50		First period	No scoring
No scoring		Second period	No scoring
No scoring		Third period	No scoring
Michael Hutchinson 24 saves / 24 shots		Goalie stats	Keith Kinkaid 34 saves / 35 shots

May 2	St. John's IceCaps	4 – 1	Albany Devils	Mile One Centre	Recap
Andrew Gordon 1 - 3:47		First period	No scoring
Andrew Gordon 2 - sh - 7:58; Andrew Gordon 3 - pp - 14:28; John Albert 1 - 17:15		Second period	9:17 - Jon Merrill 1
No scoring		Third period	No scoring
Michael Hutchinson 39 saves / 40 shots		Goalie stats	Keith Kinkaid 29 saves / 33 shots

St. John's wins series 3–1

=== Western Conference ===
==== (1) Texas Stars vs. (8) Oklahoma City Barons ====
April 23	Oklahoma City Barons	2 – 3	OT	Texas Stars	Cox Convention Center	Recap
No scoring		First period		No scoring
Austin Fyten 1 - 1:49; Curtis Hamilton 1 - 7:04		Second period		14:32 - pp - Derek Meech 1
No scoring		Third period		7:18 - Mike Hedden 1
No scoring		First overtime period		5:35 - Mike Hedden 2
Richard Bachman 30 saves / 33 shots		Goalie stats		Cristopher Nilstorp 26 saves / 28 shots

April 26	Oklahoma City Barons	2 – 3	OT	Texas Stars	Cox Convention Center	Recap
Roman Horak 1 - 5:40		First period		No scoring
No scoring		Second period		19:42 - pp - Travis Morin 1
Jujhar Khaira 1 - 11:57		Third period		19:20 - Travis Morin 2
No scoring		First overtime period		15:04 - Brendan Ranford 1
Richard Bachman 36 saves / 39 shots		Goalie stats		Jack Campbell 38 saves / 40 shots

April 30	Texas Stars	4 – 2	Oklahoma City Barons	Cedar Park Center	Recap
Brendan Ranford 2 - 7:16		First period	No scoring
Chris Mueller 1 - 1:55		Second period	8:54 - sh - Anton Lander 1
Justin Dowling 1 - pp - 11:21; Scott Glennie 1 - en - 19:00		Third period	3:24 - Brad Hunt 1
Cristopher Nilstorp 21 saves / 23 shots		Goalie stats	Richard Bachman 30 saves / 33 shots

Texas wins series 3–0

==== (2) Chicago Wolves vs. (7) Rochester Americans ====
April 25	Rochester Americans	3 – 4	OT	Chicago Wolves	Blue Cross Arena	Recap
Joel Armia 1 - 14:09; Nicolas Deslauriers 1 - pp - 15:51		First period		18:45 - pp - Brent Regner 1
Chad Ruhwedel 1 - pp - 1:47		Second period		No scoring
No scoring		Third period		15:10 - sh - Sebastian Wannstrom 1; 17:41 - Mark Cundari 1
No scoring		First overtime period		1:06 - Dmitri Jaskin 1
Andrey Makarov 35 saves / 39 shots		Goalie stats		Jake Allen 26 saves / 29 shots

April 26	Rochester Americans	3 – 2	Chicago Wolves	Blue Cross Arena	Recap
No scoring		First period	18:45 - Nathan Longpre 1
Colton Gillies 1 - 6:14; Chad Ruhwedel 2 - 10:37		Second period	No scoring
Luke Adam 1 - pp - 4:07		Third period	16:38 - pp - Keith Aucoin 1
Andrey Makarov 26 saves / 28 shots		Goalie stats	Jake Allen 28 saves / 31 shots

May 1	Chicago Wolves	4 – 0	Rochester Americans	Allstate Arena	Recap
Adam Cracknell 1 - sh - 14:08; Adam Cracknell 2 - pp - 15:56		First period	No scoring
No scoring		Second period	No scoring
Keith Aucoin 2 - pp - 2:16; Ty Rattie 1 - pp - 7:36		Third period	No scoring
Jake Allen 18 saves / 18 shots		Goalie stats	Andrey Makarov 26 saves / 30 shots

May 2	Chicago Wolves	2 – 7	Rochester Americans	Allstate Arena	Recap
Nathan Longpre 2 - 5:00		First period	1:31 - Joel Armia 2; 1:39 - Nick Crawford 1; 8:44 - pp - Joel Armia 3; 18:49 - Brayden Irwin 1
Christian Hanson 1 - 16:10		Second period	13:26 - Frederick Roy 1; 18:22 - pp - Brayden Irwin 2
No scoring		Third period	13:33 - pp - Johan Larsson 1
Jake Allen 12 saves / 17 shots Matt Climie 13 saves / 15 shots		Goalie stats	Andrey Makarov 28 saves / 30 shots

May 4	Chicago Wolves	4 – 2	Rochester Americans	Allstate Arena	Recap
Shane Harper 1 - 2:02		First period	15:21 - pp - Brayden Irwin 3
Brent Regner 2 - pp - 17:28; Dmitri Jaskin 2 - pp - 19:33		Second period	2:01 - pp - Luke Adam 2
Taylor Chorney 1 - en - 18:59		Third period	No scoring
Jake Allen 21 saves / 23 shots		Goalie stats	Andrey Makarov 32 saves / 35 shots

Chicago wins series 3–2

==== (3) Toronto Marlies vs. (6) Milwaukee Admirals ====
April 25	Milwaukee Admirals	2 – 6	Toronto Marlies	BMO Harris Bradley Center	Recap
No scoring		First period	17:46 - Sam Carrick 1
Patrick Cehlin 1 - 17:47		Second period	1:55 - pp - Josh Leivo 1; 18:55 - T. J. Brennan 1
Filip Forsberg 1 - pp - 2:09		Third period	0:46 - Jerry D'Amigo 1; 18:21 - en, sh - Kenny Ryan 1; 19:09 - en, sh - Sam Carrick 2
Marek Mazanec 22 saves / 26 shots		Goalie stats	Drew MacIntyre 28 saves / 30 shots

April 26	Milwaukee Admirals	2 – 5	Toronto Marlies	BMO Harris Bradley Center	Recap
No scoring		First period	18:51 - Brandon Kozun 1
No scoring		Second period	8:07 - pp - Sam Carrick 3
Calle Jarnkrok 1 - 0:53; Bryan Rodney 1 - 18:44		Third period	11:31 - pp - Brandon Kozun 2; 17:21 - pp - Korbinian Holzer 1; 19:20 - en - Jerry D'Amigo 2
Marek Mazanec 36 saves / 40 shots		Goalie stats	Drew MacIntyre 28 saves / 30 shots

May 1	Toronto Marlies	2 – 0	Milwaukee Admirals	Ricoh Coliseum	Recap
No scoring		First period	No scoring
Greg McKegg 1 - pp - 17:31		Second period	No scoring
T. J. Brennan 2 - pp, en - 19:35		Third period	No scoring
Drew MacIntyre 29 saves / 29 shots		Goalie stats	Marek Mazanec 21 saves / 22 shots

Toronto wins series 3–0

==== (4) Grand Rapids Griffins vs. (5) Abbotsford Heat ====
April 25	Abbotsford Heat	1 – 2	2OT	Grand Rapids Griffins	Abbotsford Entertainment & Sports Centre	Recap
Brett Olson 1 - 11:44		First period		No scoring
No scoring		Second period		No scoring
No scoring		Third period		12:37 - Mattias Backman 1
No scoring		Second overtime period		19:26 - Ryan Sproul 1
Joni Ortio 39 saves / 41 shots		Goalie stats		Petr Mrazek 55 saves / 56 shots

April 26	Abbotsford Heat	2 – 7	Grand Rapids Griffins	Abbotsford Entertainment & Sports Centre	Recap
Emile Poirier 1 - 7:40; Max Reinhart 1 - pp - 15:32		First period	10:13 - Trevor Parkes 1; 16:07 - Andrej Nestrasil 1; 19:24 - sh - Cory Emmerton 1
No scoring		Second period	2:02 - Jeff Hoggan 1; 11:19 - Andrej Nestrasil 2
No scoring		Third period	6:42 - pp - Ryan Sproul 2; 12:09 - pp - Teemu Pulkkinen 1
Joni Ortio 26 saves / 31 shots Doug Carr 13 saves / 15 shots		Goalie stats	Petr Mrazek 15 saves / 17 shots

April 30	Grand Rapids Griffins	1 – 2	Abbotsford Heat	Van Andel Arena	Recap
Tomas Jurco 1 - pp - 17:27		First period	No scoring
No scoring		Second period	No scoring
No scoring		Third period	5:52 - Corey Locke 1; 18:58 - pp - Markus Granlund 1
Petr Mrazek 23 saves / 25 shots		Goalie stats	Joni Ortio 34 saves / 35 shots

May 2	Grand Rapids Griffins	5 – 3	Abbotsford Heat	Van Andel Arena	Recap
No scoring		First period	14:21 - Shane O'Brien 1
Teemu Pulkkinen 2 - pp - 7:26; Jeff Hoggan 2 - 9:49; Jeff Hoggan 3 - 19:26		Second period	13:16 - Kane Lafranchise 1
Riley Sheahan 1 - pp - 4:51; Landon Ferraro 1 - en - 19:47		Third period	5:46 - pp - Markus Granlund 2
Petr Mrazek 24 saves / 27 shots		Goalie stats	Joni Ortio 31 saves / 35 shots

Grand Rapids wins series 3–1

== Conference semifinals ==
=== Eastern Conference ===
==== (4) St. John's IceCaps vs. (8) Norfolk Admirals ====
May 6	St. John's IceCaps	1 – 3	Norfolk Admirals	Mile One Centre	Recap
No scoring		First period	10:14 - Nicolas Kerdiles 2
No scoring		Second period	No scoring
Andrew Gordon 4 - 3:20		Third period	7:00 - John Kurtz 1; 19:46 - en - Nicolas Kerdiles 3
Michael Hutchinson 23 saves / 25 shots		Goalie stats	John Gibson 42 saves / 43 shots

May 7	St. John's IceCaps	2 – 1	Norfolk Admirals	Mile One Centre	Recap
No scoring		First period	No scoring
Josh Morrissey 1 - pp - 2:48; Jason Jaffray 1 - pp - 5:33		Second period	No scoring
No scoring		Third period	10:05 - pp - Chris Wagner 2
Michael Hutchinson 32 saves / 33 shots		Goalie stats	John Gibson 39 saves / 41 shots

May 10	Norfolk Admirals	3 – 5	St. John's IceCaps	Norfolk Scope	Recap
Max Friberg 2 - 16:53; Jesse Blacker 1 - 18:25		First period	11:19 - pp - Eric O'Dell 2
No scoring		Second period	No scoring
Josh Manson 1 - 9:35		Third period	0:39 - Josh Morrissey 2; 8:48 - Andrew Gordon 5; 10:40 - Jerome Samson 1; 19:52 - en - Adam Lowry 1
Brad Thiessen 26 saves / 30 shots		Goalie stats	Michael Hutchinson 24 saves / 27 shots

May 12	Norfolk Admirals	1 – 5	St. John's IceCaps	Norfolk Scope	Recap
No scoring		First period	4:11 - Carl Klingberg 1; 14:39 - pp - Jason Jaffray 2
Andre Petersson 1 - 8:36		Second period	2:37 - Jerome Samson 2; 4:05 - Eric O'Dell 3
No scoring		Third period	14:57 - Eric O'Dell 4
Brad Thiessen 23 saves / 28 shots		Goalie stats	Michael Hutchinson 28 saves / 29 shots

May 13	Norfolk Admirals	3 – 2	OT	St. John's IceCaps	Norfolk Scope	Recap
Max Friberg 3 - 18:11		First period		6:23 - Eric O'Dell 5
No scoring		Second period		No scoring
Shea Theodore 1 - 0:48		Third period		17:02 - Eric O'Dell 6
Andre Petersson 2 - pp - 13:10		First overtime period		No scoring
Brad Thiessen 36 saves / 38 shots		Goalie stats		Michael Hutchinson 34 saves / 37 shots

May 16	St. John's IceCaps	5 – 2	Norfolk Admirals	Mile One Centre	Recap
Jerome Samson 3 - 5:29		First period	7:13 - pp - Andre Petersson 3
Eric O'Dell 7 - pp - 10:21; Kyle MacKinnon 1 - 17:03		Second period	14:22 - Steve Eminger 1
Andrew Gordon 6 - 3:27; Ben Chiarot 2 - 4:08		Third period	No scoring
Michael Hutchinson 26 saves / 28 shots		Goalie stats	Brad Thiessen 34 saves / 39 shots

St. John's wins series 4–2

==== (6) Wilkes-Barre/Scranton Penguins vs. (7) Providence Bruins ====
May 9	Wilkes-Barre/Scranton Penguins	0 – 4	Providence Bruins	Mohegan Sun Arena at Casey Plaza	Recap
No scoring		First period	1:33 - Alexander Khokhlachev 3; 7:03 - pp - Craig Cunningham 2; 7:48 - Andrew Cherniwchan 1; 8:03 - Alexander Khokhlachev 4
No scoring		Second period	No scoring
No scoring		Third period	No scoring
Peter Mannino 24 saves / 28 shots		Goalie stats	Niklas Svedberg 20 saves / 20 shots

May 10	Wilkes-Barre/Scranton Penguins	6 – 1	Providence Bruins	Mohegan Sun Arena at Casey Plaza	Recap
No scoring		First period	No scoring
Conor Sheary 1 - 5:41; Anton Zlobin 2 - 15:58; Anton Zlobin 3 - pp - 16:44; Chuck Kobasew 4 - pp - 19:07		Second period	11:25 - pp - Justin Florek 1
Tom Kostopoulos 2 - pp - 4:26; Brian Dumoulin 2 - 10:29		Third period	No scoring
Peter Mannino 23 saves / 24 shots		Goalie stats	Niklas Svedberg 19 saves / 24 shots Malcolm Subban 0 saves / 1 shot

May 14	Providence Bruins	4 – 5	2OT	Wilkes-Barre/Scranton Penguins	Dunkin' Donuts Center	Recap
No scoring		First period		No scoring
Seth Griffith 3 - pp - 15:16; Joe Morrow - 18:36		Second period		7:14 - Chuck Kobasew 5
Blake Parlett 2 - 0:15; Alexander Khokhlachev 5 - 1:06		Third period		7:37 - pp - Tom Kostopoulos 3; 12:10 - Simon Despres 1; 14:09 - Conor Sheary 2
No scoring		Second overtime period		6:32 - Simon Despres 2
Niklas Svedberg 38 saves / 43 shots		Goalie stats		Peter Mannino 36 saves / 40 shots

May 16	Providence Bruins	3 – 2	OT	Wilkes-Barre/Scranton Penguins	Dunkin' Donuts Center	Recap
Seth Griffith 4 - 3:11		First period		No scoring
No scoring		Second period		13:16 - Reid McNeill 1
Ryan Spooner 4 - 19:59		Third period		4:01 - Conor Sheary 3
Cory Kane 1 - 6:31		First overtime period		No scoring
Malcolm Subban 28 saves / 30 shots		Goalie stats		Peter Mannino 28 saves / 31 shots

May 17	Providence Bruins	2 – 3	Wilkes-Barre/Scranton Penguins	Dunkin' Donuts Center	Recap
Craig Cunningham 3 - pp - 12:47		First period	16:29 - Harry Zolnierczyk 3; 18:16 - pp - Josh Archibald 1
Tyler Randell 1 - 15:44		Second period	No scoring
No scoring		Third period	14:20 - Anton Zlobin 4
Malcolm Subban 20 saves / 23 shots		Goalie stats	Peter Mannino 31 saves / 33 shots

May 19	Wilkes-Barre/Scranton Penguins	1 – 4	Providence Bruins	Mohegan Sun Arena at Casey Plaza	Recap
No scoring		First period	No scoring
No scoring		Second period	7:51 - Alexander Khokhlachev 6; 12:56 - Bobby Robins 1
Conor Sheary 4 - 17:03		Third period	1:36 - pp - Alexander Khokhlachev 7; 18:11 - en - Ryan Spooner 5
Peter Mannino 12 saves / 15 shots		Goalie stats	Niklas Svedberg 36 saves / 37 shots

May 21	Wilkes-Barre/Scranton Penguins	5 – 4	Providence Bruins	Mohegan Sun Arena at Casey Plaza	Recap
No scoring		First period	No scoring
Anton Zlobin 5 - 1:17; Conor Sheary 5 - pp - 3:24; Jayson Megna 1 - 5:22; Brian Gibbons 1 - 5:35; Brendan Mikkelson 1 - pp - 7:16		Second period	19:06 - sh - David Warsofsky 2
No scoring		Third period	0:23 - Ryan Spooner 6; 6:43 - Alexander Khokhlachev 8; 9:55 - pp - Alexander Khokhlachev 9
Peter Mannino 21 saves / 25 shots		Goalie stats	Niklas Svedberg 11 saves / 15 shots Malcolm Subban 11 saves / 12 shots

Wilkes-Barre/Scranton wins series 4–3

=== Western Conference ===
==== (1) Texas Stars vs. (4) Grand Rapids Griffins ====
May 8	Texas Stars	5 – 2	Grand Rapids Griffins	Cedar Park Center	Recap
Brendan Ranford 3 - 3:19; Dustin Jeffrey 1 - 3:32; Mike Hedden 3 - pp - 18:51		First period	4:42 - pp - Cory Emmerton 2
Curtis McKenzie 1 - 5:41; Dustin Jeffrey 2 - pp - 10:02		Second period	4:20 - Tomas Jurco 2
No scoring		Third period	No scoring
Jack Campbell 23 saves / 25 shots		Goalie stats	Petr Mrazek 31 saves / 36 shots

May 10	Texas Stars	4 – 0	Grand Rapids Griffins	Cedar Park Center	Recap
Brendan Ranford 4 - 19:15		First period	No scoring
Justin Dowling 2 - 7:36; Justin Dowling 3 - pp - 10:28		Second period	No scoring
Brendan Ranford 5 - 9:20		Third period	No scoring
Cristopher Nilstorp 30 saves / 30 shots		Goalie stats	Petr Mrazek 33 saves / 37 shots

May 13	Grand Rapids Griffins	5 – 2	Texas Stars	Van Andel Arena	Recap
Tomas Jurco 3 - 7:06; Tomas Jurco 4 - pp - 13:44		First period	No scoring
Andrej Nestrasil 3 - 0:25; Teemu Pulkkinen 3 - 8:23; Tomas Jurco 5 - 16:07		Second period	No scoring
No scoring		Third period	2:24 - Mike Hedden 4; 5:47 - Brendan Ranford 6
Petr Mrazek 35 saves / 37 shots		Goalie stats	Jack Campbell 15 saves / 19 shots Cristopher Nilstorp 2 saves / 3 shots

May 14	Grand Rapids Griffins	3 – 2	Texas Stars	Van Andel Arena	Recap
No scoring		First period	No scoring
Jeff Hoggan 4 - pp - 3:48; David McIntyre 1 - 10:36; Andrej Nestrasil 4 - 13:58		Second period	0:13 - pp - Dustin Jeffrey 3; 19:16 - Derek Meech 2
No scoring		Third period	No scoring
Petr Mrazek 33 saves / 35 shots		Goalie stats	Cristopher Nilstorp 22 saves / 25 shots

May 16	Grand Rapids Griffins	2 – 3	OT	Texas Stars	Van Andel Arena	Recap
No scoring		First period		6:36 - pp - Mike Hedden 5; 7:35 - Brendan Ranford 7
Mitch Callahan 1 - pp - 11:22; Teemu Pulkkinen 4 - 17:57		Second period		No scoring
No scoring		Third period		No scoring
No scoring		First overtime period		3:18 - Chris Mueller 2
Petr Mrazek 26 saves / 29 shots		Goalie stats		Jack Campbell 34 saves / 36 shots Cristopher Nilstorp 4 saves / 4 shots

May 18	Texas Stars	7 – 1	Grand Rapids Griffins	Cedar Park Center	Recap
Chris Mueller 3 - 3:56; Dustin Jeffrey 4 - 4:58; Derek Meech 3 - 10:37		First period	0:36 - Teemu Pulkkinen 5
Radek Faksa 1 - 2:03		Second period	No scoring
Radek Faksa 2 - 2:24; Brett Ritchie 1 - pp - 11:53; Dustin Jeffrey 5 - en sh - 13:44		Third period	No scoring
Cristopher Nilstorp 23 saves / 24 shots		Goalie stats	Petr Mrazek 13 saves / 17 shots Tom McCollum 14 saves / 16 shots

Texas wins series 4–2

==== (2) Chicago Wolves vs. (3) Toronto Marlies ====
May 9	Chicago Wolves	2 – 5	Toronto Marlies	Allstate Arena	Recap
No scoring		First period	10:54 - pp - Trevor Smith 1; 14:55 - pp - Peter Holland 1
Christian Hanson 2 - 10:04; Michael Davies 1 - 17:26		Second period	5:02 - Greg McKegg 2
No scoring		Third period	3:53 - Carter Ashton 1; 17:09 - Sam Carrick 4
Jake Allen 30 saves / 35 shots		Goalie stats	Drew MacIntyre 37 saves / 39 shots

May 10	Chicago Wolves	2 – 4	Toronto Marlies	Allstate Arena	Recap
No scoring		First period	1:04 - Peter Holland 2; 7:38 - Trevor Smith 2; 14:46 - Josh Leivo 2
Shane Harper 2 - 1:46		Second period	No scoring
Dmitri Jaskin 3 - pp - 17:21		Third period	19:03 - en - Jerry D'Amigo 3
Jake Allen 18 saves / 21 shots		Goalie stats	Drew MacIntyre 22 saves / 24 shots

May 14	Toronto Marlies	4 – 3	OT	Chicago Wolves	Ricoh Coliseum	Recap
T. J. Brennan 3 - pp - 5:26; Peter Holland 3 - 16:31; Brandon Kozun 3 - 18:39		First period		15:41 - pp - Dmitri Jaskin 4; 18:28 - Adam Cracknell 3
No scoring		Second period		11:34 - Tyler Shattock 1
No scoring		Third period		No scoring
Jerry D'Amigo 4 - 3:28		First overtime period		No scoring
Drew MacIntyre 32 saves / 35 shots		Goalie stats		Jake Allen 26 saves / 30 shots

May 16	Toronto Marlies	4 – 0	Chicago Wolves	Ricoh Coliseum	Recap
Greg McKegg 3 - 7:51		First period	No scoring
Carter Ashton 2 - 2:46		Second period	No scoring
Peter Holland 4 - 7:09; Korbinian Holzer 2 - en - 19:55		Third period	No scoring
Drew MacIntyre 30 saves / 30 shots		Goalie stats	Jake Allen 25 saves / 28 shots

Toronto wins series 4–0

== Conference finals ==
=== Eastern Conference ===
==== (4) St. John's IceCaps vs. (6) Wilkes-Barre/Scranton Penguins ====
May 24	St. John's IceCaps	2 – 3	Wilkes-Barre/Scranton Penguins	Mile One Centre	Recap
13:42 - Andrew Gordon 7		First period	7:02 - Chuck Kobasew 6
No scoring		Second period	2:32 - Conor Sheary 6; 14:36 - Tom Kostopoulos 4
5:31 - Andrew Gordon 8		Third period	No scoring
Michael Hutchinson 29 saves / 32 shots		Goalie stats	Peter Mannino 31 saves / 33 shots

May 25	St. John's IceCaps	2 – 1	Wilkes-Barre/Scranton Penguins	Mile One Centre	Recap
Kyle MacKinnon 2 - 13:54		First period	No scoring
Carl Klingberg 2 - 6:24		Second period	No scoring
No scoring		Third period	18:56 - Anton Zlobin 6
Michael Hutchinson 34 saves / 35 shots		Goalie stats	Peter Mannino 27 saves / 29 shots

May 28	Wilkes-Barre/Scranton Penguins	0 – 5	St. John's IceCaps	Mohegan Sun Arena at Casey Plaza	Recap
No scoring		First period	11:24 - pp - Patrice Cormier 1; 13:15 - Jason Jaffray 3
No scoring		Second period	1:35 - Eric O'Dell 8; 6:24 - pp - Kael Mouillierat 3; 19:59 - Zach Redmond 1
No scoring		Third period	No scoring
Peter Mannino 19 saves / 24 shots Matt Murray 8 saves / 8 shots		Goalie stats	Michael Hutchinson 30 saves / 30 shots

May 29	Wilkes-Barre/Scranton Penguins	1 – 2	St. John's IceCaps	Mohegan Sun Arena at Casey Plaza	Recap
No scoring		First period	No scoring
No scoring		Second period	19:33 - pp - Will O'Neill 1
Brian Dumoulin 3 - 6:48		Third period	9:19 - pp - Josh Lunden 1
Peter Mannino 29 saves / 31 shots		Goalie stats	Michael Hutchinson 17 saves / 18 shots

May 31	Wilkes-Barre/Scranton Penguins	4 – 2	St. John's IceCaps	Mohegan Sun Arena at Casey Plaza	Recap
No scoring		First period	12:27 - pp - Will O'Neill 2
Spencer Machacek 1 - 3:49		Second period	14:05 - pp - Patrice Cormier 2
Chuck Kobasew 7 - 12:30; Zach Sill 1 - 19:44; Chuck Kobasew 8 - en - 19:53		Third period	No scoring
Peter Mannino 19 saves / 21 shots		Goalie stats	Michael Hutchinson 28 saves / 31 shots

June 3	St. John's IceCaps	5 – 0	Wilkes-Barre/Scranton Penguins	Mile One Centre	Recap
Eric O'Dell 9 - pp - 17:53		First period	No scoring
Adam Lowry 2 - 3:24		Second period	No scoring
Blair Riley 1 - 2:23; Zach Redmond 2 - 5:21; Jason Jaffray 4 - en - 19:12		Third period	No scoring
Michael Hutchinson 34 saves / 34 shots		Goalie stats	Peter Mannino 24 saves / 28 shots

St. John's wins series 4–2

=== Western Conference ===
==== (1) Texas Stars vs. (3) Toronto Marlies ====
May 23	Texas Stars	1 – 5	Toronto Marlies	Cedar Park Center	Recap
No scoring		First period	3:11 - Brandon Kozun 4
Chris Mueller 4 - pp - 15:33		Second period	7:55 - pp - T. J. Brennan 4; 7:28 - Peter Holland 5
No scoring		Third period	17:50 - en - Sam Carrick 5; 18:19 - en - Jerred Smithson 1
Cristopher Nilstorp 14 saves / 17 shots		Goalie stats	Drew MacIntyre 49 saves / 50 shots

May 26	Texas Stars	6 – 3	Toronto Marlies	Cedar Park Center	Recap
Brett Ritchie 2 - pp - 16:51		First period	4:22 - Jerry D'Amigo 5
Scott Glennie 2 - 8:37; Brett Ritchie 3 - 16:45; Chris Mueller 5 - 18:59		Second period	14:26 - pp - Josh Leivo 3; 18:11 - Peter Holland 6
Scott Glennie 3 - 14:07; Travis Morin 3 - en - 19:50		Third period	No scoring
Cristopher Nilstorp 27 saves / 30 shots		Goalie stats	Drew MacIntyre 46 saves / 51 shots

May 28	Toronto Marlies	2 – 3	Texas Stars	Ricoh Coliseum	Recap
T. J. Brennan 5 - 9:16		First period	No scoring
No scoring		Second period	3:16 - Patrik Nemeth 1
T. J. Brennan 6 - 10:15		Third period	6:59 - Kevin Henderson 1; 11:14 - Travis Morin 4
Drew MacIntyre 27 saves / 30 shots		Goalie stats	Cristopher Nilstorp 20 saves / 22 shots

May 29	Toronto Marlies	4 – 1	Texas Stars	Ricoh Coliseum	Recap
Spencer Abbott 1 - pp - 1:36; Spencer Abbott 2 - pp - 5:14		First period	No scoring
Spencer Abbott 3 - pp - 7:05		Second period	No scoring
Jerry D'Amigo 6 - en - 16:31		Third period	18:18 - Radek Faksa 4
Drew MacIntyre 27 saves / 28 shots		Goalie stats	Cristopher Nilstorp 24 saves / 27 shots

May 31	Toronto Marlies	1 – 2	Texas Stars	Ricoh Coliseum	Recap
Spencer Abbott 4 - 0:41		First period	No scoring
No scoring		Second period	11:10 - Scott Glennie 4
No scoring		Third period	9:02 - Taylor Peters 1
Drew MacIntyre 31 saves / 33 shots		Goalie stats	Cristopher Nilstorp 17 saves / 18 shots

June 2	Texas Stars	1 – 3	Toronto Marlies	Cedar Park Center	Recap
No scoring		First period	8:45 - Carter Ashton 3
No scoring		Second period	2:28 - pp - Trevor Smith 3; 19:04 - Carter Ashton 4
Curtis McKenzie 2 - pp - 16:35		Third period	No scoring
Cristopher Nilstorp 22 saves / 25 shots		Goalie stats	Drew MacIntyre 36 saves / 37 shots

June 3	Texas Stars	6 – 2	Toronto Marlies	Cedar Park Center	Recap
No scoring		First period	2:19 - Frazer McLaren 1
Mike Hedden 6 - 17:22; Dustin Jeffrey 6 - pp - 18:13		Second period	0:23 - Peter Holland 7
Brett Ritchie 4 - 6:28; Matej Stransky 1 - 6:45; Justin Dowling 4 - 14:32; Dustin Jeffrey 7 - en - 15:04		Third period	No scoring
Cristopher Nilstorp 25 saves / 27 shots		Goalie stats	Drew MacIntyre 44 saves / 49 shots

Texas wins series 4–3

== Calder Cup Finals ==
=== Texas Stars vs. St. John's IceCaps ===
June 8	Texas Stars	6 – 3	St. John's IceCaps	Cedar Park Center	Recap
Travis Morin 5 - pp - 3:08		First period	No scoring
Chris Mueller 6 - 3:52; Scott Glennie 5 - 12:17; Travis Morin 6 - sh - 16:51		Second period	1:47 - Will O'Neill 3
Scott Glennie 6 - 8:27; Mike Hedden 7 - en - 18:19		Third period	2:36 - Kael Mouillierat 4; 9:18 - Jordan Hill 1
Cristopher Nilstorp 26 saves / 29 shots		Goalie stats	Michael Hutchinson 17 saves / 22 shots

June 9	Texas Stars	1 – 2	St. John's IceCaps	Cedar Park Center	Recap
No scoring		First period	4:05 - Kael Mouillierat 5
Brendan Ranford 8 - 0:29		Second period	1:13 - Blair Riley 2
No scoring		Third period	No scoring
Cristopher Nilstorp 33 saves / 35 shots		Goalie stats	Michael Hutchinson 49 saves / 50 shots

June 11	St. John's IceCaps	1 – 2	OT	Texas Stars	Mile One Centre	Recap
No scoring		First period		No scoring
No scoring		Second period		15:54 - Brett Ritchie 5
Kael Mouillierat 6 - 11:44		Third period		No scoring
No scoring		First overtime period		7:20 - Travis Morin 7
Michael Hutchinson 34 saves / 36 shots		Goalie stats		Cristopher Nilstorp 31 saves / 32 shots

June 16	St. John's IceCaps	3 – 4	OT	Texas Stars	Mile One Centre	Recap
Ben Chiarot 2 - sh - 13:02		First period		No scoring
Carl Klingberg 3 - 0:57; Kael Mouillierat 7 - pp - 9:21		Second period		15:33 - Travis Morin 8; 18:09 - Curtis McKenzie 3
No scoring		Third period		17:51 - Brett Ritchie 6
No scoring		First overtime period		2:24 - Travis Morin 9
Michael Hutchinson 34 saves / 38 shots		Goalie stats		Cristopher Nilstorp 32 saves / 35 shots

June 17	St. John's IceCaps	3 – 4	OT	Texas Stars	Mile One Centre	Recap
No scoring		First period		18:52 - Mike Hedden 8
Jordan Hill 2 - 11:06; Josh Lunden 2 - 16:58		Second period		4:59 - Brett Ritchie 7
Blair Riley 3 - 6:33		Third period		13:26 - Mike Hedden 9
No scoring		First overtime period		14:30 - Patrik Nemeth 1
Michael Hutchinson 41 saves / 45 shots		Goalie stats		Cristopher Nilstorp 33 saves / 36 shots

Texas wins series 4–1

== Playoff statistical leaders ==
=== Leading skaters ===
These are the top ten skaters based on points. If there is a tie in points, goals take precedence over assists.

GP = Games played; G = Goals; A = Assists; Pts = Points; +/– = Plus–minus; PIM = Penalty minutes

Player	Team	GP	G	A	Pts	PIM
Travis Morin	Texas Stars	21	9	13	22	12
Mike Hedden	Texas Stars	21	9	10	19	20
Andrew Gordon	St. John's IceCaps	21	8	11	19	22
Brendan Ranford	Texas Stars	21	8	8	16	12
Will O'Neill	St. John's IceCaps	18	3	13	16	27
Peter Holland	Toronto Marlies	11	7	8	15	6
Ryan Spooner	Providence Bruins	12	6	9	15	2
Alexander Khokhlachev	Providence Bruins	12	9	5	14	12
Eric O'Dell	St. John's IceCaps	21	9	5	14	20
Chuck Kobasew	Wilkes-Barre/Scranton Penguins	14	8	6	14	40

=== Leading goaltenders ===
This is a combined table of the top five goaltenders based on goals against average and the top five goaltenders based on save percentage with at least 60 minutes played. The table is initially sorted by goals against average, with the criterion for inclusion in bold.

GP = Games played; W = Wins; L = Losses; SA = Shots against; GA = Goals against; GAA = Goals against average; SV% = Save percentage; SO = Shutouts; TOI = Time on ice (in minutes)

Player	Team	GP	W	L	SA	GA	GAA	SV%	SO	TOI
John Gibson	Norfolk Admirals	6	4	2	198	9	**1.45**	**.955**	1	373:03
Jean-Francois Berube	Manchester Monarchs	4	1	3	110	7	**1.67**	**.936**	1	252:14
Michael Hutchinson	St. John's IceCaps	21	12	9	676	42	**1.95**	**.938**	3	1290:05
Drew MacIntyre	Toronto Marlies	14	10	4	495	29	**2.08**	**.941**	2	837:29
Cristopher Nilstorp	Texas Stars	19	13	5	470	38	**2.17**	.919	1	1051:20
Keith Kinkaid	Albany Devils	4	1	3	132	9	2.26	**.932**	0	238:27

Preceded by 2013 Calder Cup playoffs	Calder Cup playoffs 2014	Succeeded by 2015 Calder Cup playoffs
