= Curtis McKenzie (ice hockey) =

Canadian ice hockey player (born 1991)

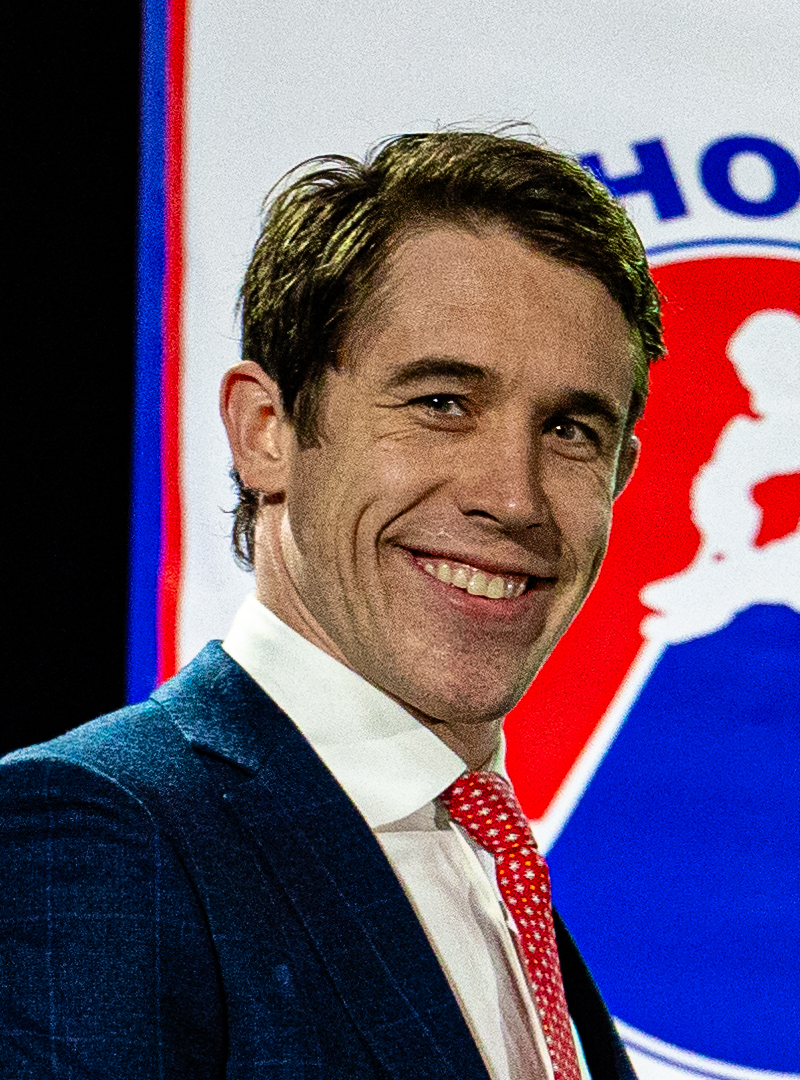
- McKenzie in 2025
- Born: February 22, 1991 (age 35) Golden, British Columbia, Canada
- Height: 6 ft 2 in (188 cm)
- Weight: 205 lb (93 kg; 14 st 9 lb)
- Position: Left wing
- Shot: Left
- AHL team Former teams: Texas Stars; Dallas Stars
- NHL draft: 159th overall, 2009; Dallas Stars
- Playing career: 2013–present

Curtis McKenzie (born February 22, 1991) is a Canadian professional ice hockey forward and captain for the Texas Stars of the American Hockey League (AHL). McKenzie was selected by the Dallas Stars in the 6th round (159th overall) of the 2009 NHL entry draft.

== Early life ==
McKenzie was born on February 22, 1991, in Golden, British Columbia, Canada to parents Bruce McKenzie and Sandra Becket. McKenzie attended Burnaby Mountain Secondary School in Burnaby, British Columbia.

== Playing career ==
=== Amateur ===
McKenzie began playing organized ice hockey within the Golden Minor Hockey Association. He spent the 2005–06 season with the Burnaby Winter Club U15 team, playing alongside Landon Ferraro. Despite being drafted by the Red Deer Rebels in the 2006 Western Hockey League bantam draft, McKenzie played out the 2006–07 season with the Vancouver North West Hawks U18 team. He then joined the Penticton Vees of the British Columbia Hockey League (BCHL) for the 2007–08 season. While playing on the team's third and fourth lines, McKenzie finished his rookie season with three goals and seven assists en route to the BCHL League Championship title. Before the start of the 2008–09 season, McKenzie committed to play collegiate hockey at Miami University with the Miami RedHawks men's ice hockey team in 2009.

McKenzie set new career-highs during the 2008–09 season and finished with 30 goals and 34 assists for 64 points over 53 games. He participated in the 2008 Canadian Junior Hockey League Prospects Game and was named to the BCHL Interior Conference All Star Team. McKenzie was also chosen to represent Team Canada West at the 2008 World Junior A Challenge in Camrose, Alberta. He scored one goal to help them earn a silver medal while playing alongside Brodie Reid and Denver Manderson. After the season concluded, McKenzie was drafted by the Dallas Stars, 159th overall, in the 2009 NHL entry draft.

=== Collegiate ===
McKenzie played four seasons of college hockey for the Miami RedHawks at Miami University while majoring in accounting. He scored his first collegiate goal in his debut game on October 9, 2009, against St. Cloud State. He finished the regular season leading all team freshmen in scoring with six goal and 21 assists for 27 points. He also ranked sixth among all rookies in the Central Collegiate Hockey Association. After helping the RedHawks qualify for the 2010 NCAA Division I men's ice hockey tournament, McKenzie scored a goal and an assist in the RedHawks' regional semifinal win over Alabama–Huntsville.

McKenzie concluded his collegiate career on April 12, 2013, by signing a two-year entry-level contract with the Dallas Stars for the 2013–14 season. He also signed an amateur contract agreement with the Stars' American Hockey League (AHL) affiliate, the Texas Stars, to play out the remainder of the 2012–13 season.

=== Professional ===
==== Dallas Stars organization (2013–2018) ====
McKenzie made his AHL debut on April 6, 2013, against the Hamilton Bulldogs and recorded his first professional fight that night against Kyle Hagel. He recorded one point over five games and accumulated 14 penalty minutes. Once the Stars' 2012–13 season ended, McKenzie moved in with his grandparents in Vancouver and trained locally with various NHL players.

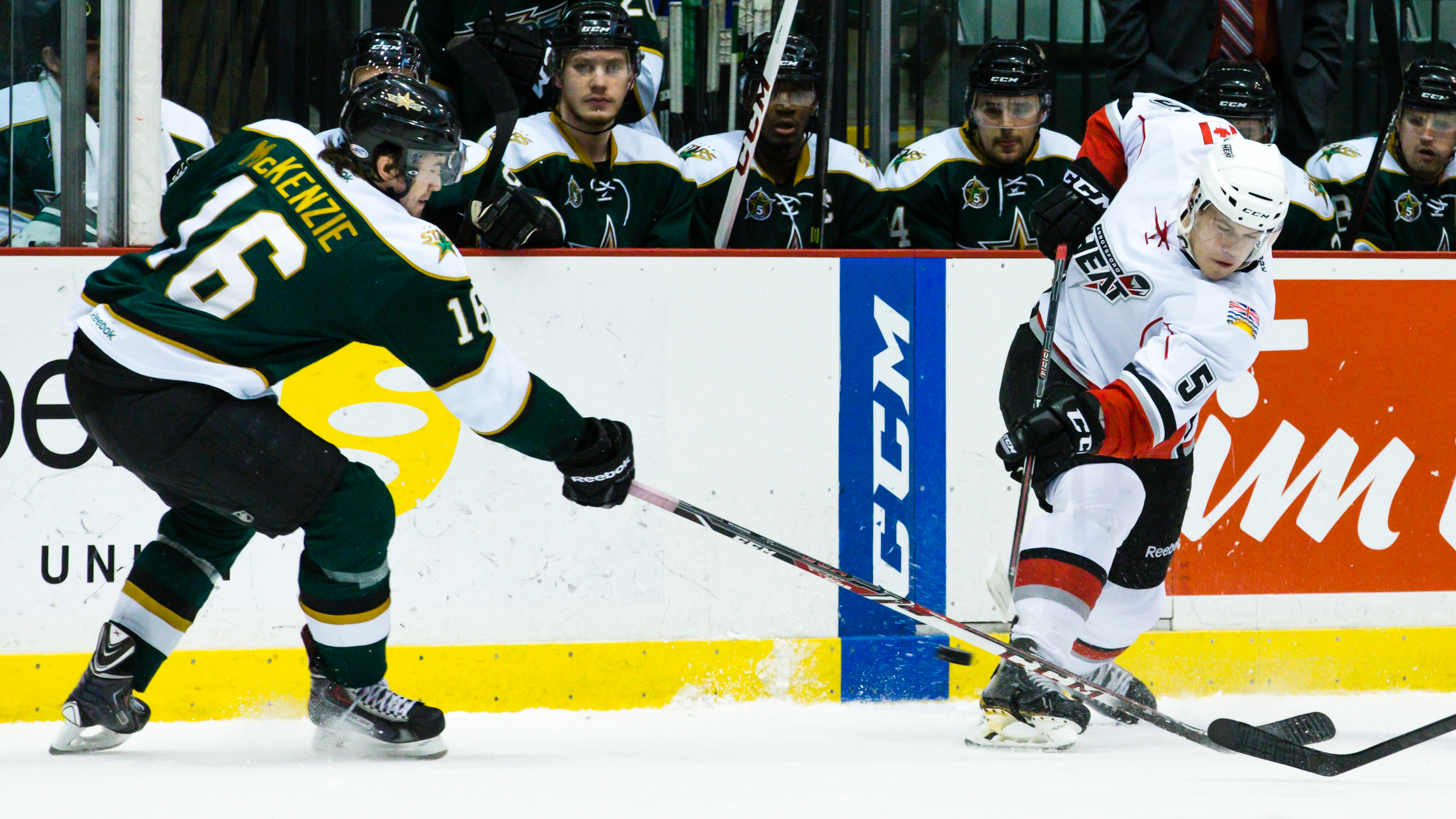
McKenzie (left) with the Texas Stars in 2014.

McKenzie participated in the Dallas Stars' 2013 prospects tournament before being reassigned to the Texas Stars for the 2013–14 season. He scored his first AHL goal on October 6, 2013, against the Rockford IceHogs. As the season progressed, he was often placed on the Stars' top line with Travis Morin and Colton Sceviour. Through December, McKenzie recorded five multiple-point games and closed out the month by assisting on the Stars' game-tying goal. As such, he was recognized as the AHL's Rookie of the Month. McKenzie and Morin set a franchise record by recording four assists in a single game on January 17, 2014. McKenzie continued to score goals through the second half of the season and led all rookies with 45 points through 49 games. He recorded his first professional hat-trick on April 12, 2014, against the San Antonio Rampage to help the team clinch first place in the Western Conference and set a new franchise record for most consecutive wins. McKenzie finished his rookie season leading all rookies, and ranking ninth overall, with 27 goals and 38 assists. McKenzie remained with linemates Travis Morin and Colton Sceviour through the 2014 Calder Cup playoffs and scored three goals and 11 assists through 21 games. He became the ninth player in AHL history to earn Rookie of the Year honours and a Calder Cup. In recognition of his efforts, McKenzie received the Dudley "Red" Garrett Memorial Award as the AHL's Rookie of the Year and was named to the 2013–14 AHL All-Rookie Team.

McKenzie participated in the Dallas Stars' 2014 training camp but was reassigned to the AHL on September 30, 2014, to start the 2014–15 season. However, his demotion was short-lived as he was recalled to the NHL level on October 14, 2014. McKenzie was scratched for the Stars' next two games before making his NHL debut on October 18 against the Philadelphia Flyers. He was returned to the AHL on October 29, but called up again on November 8. McKenzie scored his first career goal on November 16, against Corey Crawford of the Chicago Blackhawks. He finished with four goals and one assist through 36 regular-season NHL games and 21 points through 31 AHL games. McKenzie signed a two-year, $675,000 contract extension with the Stars on July 1, 2015.

McKenzie was the final player cut from the Dallas Stars' training camp before the start of the 2015–16 season. He recorded three assists in one game with Texas before being recalled to the NHL level on October 14. In his season debut the following day, McKenzie was hit from behind by Tampa Bay Lightning defenseman Nikita Nesterov. While Nesterov was suspended for two games, McKenzie missed over a month of gameplay to recover. He was returned to the AHL on November 16 once he fully recovered from the severe trauma in his hip labrum. He played in 39 games for the Stars before being recalled to the NHL on February 14, 2016. However, he was returned to the AHL after playing in only one game. McKenzie remained with the Texas Stars for the rest of their regular-season and finished with 24 goals and 31 assists through 61 games. Once the Stars were eliminated from the 2016 Calder Cup playoffs, McKenzie was recalled to the NHL level to join the Dallas Stars for the 2016 Stanley Cup playoffs. He made his Stanley Cup playoffs debut in Game 3 of their first-round series against the St. Louis Blues.

McKenzie was named to the Dallas Stars' opening night roster for the 2016–17 season. He played the entirety of the season in the NHL and was leaned on to replace their heavily injured lineup. After scoring seven goals and 11 assists, McKenzie signed a one-year contract extension with the Stars on March 10, 2017. However, shortly thereafter he suffered an eye injury due to a high-stick during a game against the Boston Bruins. While he avoided permanent injury, the Stars chose to rest him for the remainder of the season as they had already been eliminated from playoff contention.

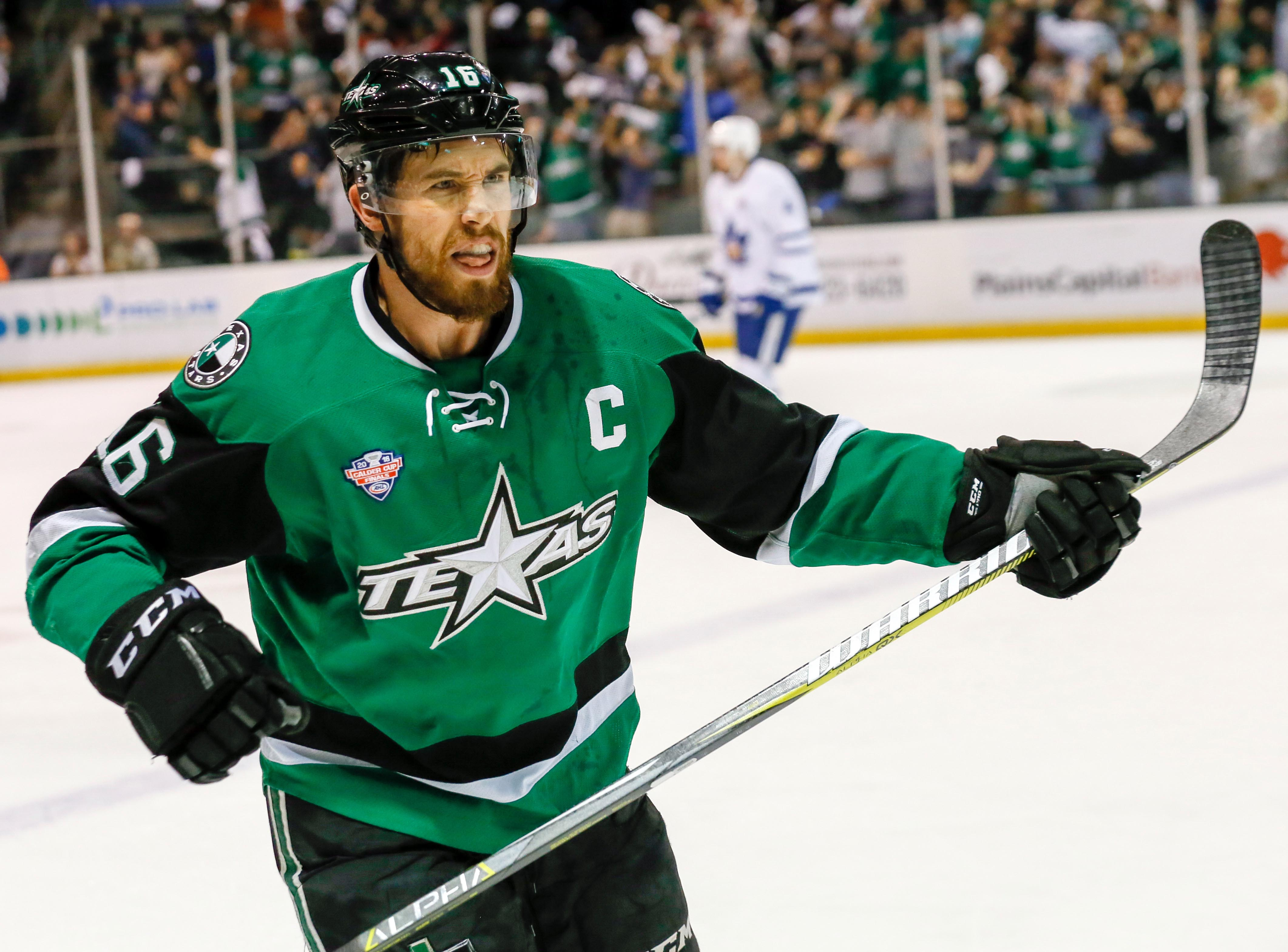
MacKenzie playing for the Texas Stars in 2018.

McKenzie was reassigned to the Texas Stars for the 2017–18 season after participating in the Dallas Stars' training camp. Despite being recalled to the NHL level early in November, McKenzie was a major contributor to the Texas Stars' lineup. Before his November 8 call-up, McKenzie tied a franchise record by tallying five points in the Stars' 6–2 win over the San Diego Gulls. Shortly after returning to the AHL on November 11, McKenzie was named team captain. In this role, he helped the Stars finish the month with four consecutive wins by recording his second career AHL hat-trick on November 29. McKenzie was recalled to the NHL level on December 2 after playing in 19 games for the Texas Stars. While he was given limited minutes of ice time, head coach Ken Hitchcock said: "McKenzie is getting better and better every day." He recorded one assist and nine penalty minutes in four games with Dallas before being returned to the AHL. After rejoining the Texes Stars, McKenzie recorded his third career AHL hat-trick on December 27 against the San Antonio Rampage. In recognition of his efforts, McKenzie was named to the AHL All-Star Classic for the first time in his career. On January 19, McKenzie recorded three points against the Manitoba Moose to reach the 200 point milestone of his AHL career. However, he was unable to participate in the All-Star Classic due to an injury at the end of January. McKenzie missed the entirety of February to recover and did not return to the lineup until March 9, 2018. While he failed to collect a point in his first game back, he quickly tallied three points in his next two games. Due to an injury in the Dallas Stars' lineup, McKenzie was recalled to the NHL level on March 20. Upon being recalled, McKenzie stressed that he felt this was "the final push for me to show that I can be an NHL player for next year." He skated in three games with the Dallas Stars before rejoining the Texas Stars for the remainder of the regular-season.

McKenzie finished the regular season with 25 goals and 23 assists to help the Texas Stars qualify for the 2018 Calder Cup playoffs. McKenzie entered the 2018 Calder Cup Finals as the team leader in scoring with six goals and nine assists through 15 games. He scored a goal in Game 6 against the Toronto Marlies to push their best-of-seven series to final death. However, the Stars were ultimately eliminated by the Marlies in a 6–1 loss.

==== Chicago Wolves and Utica Comets (2018–2021) ====
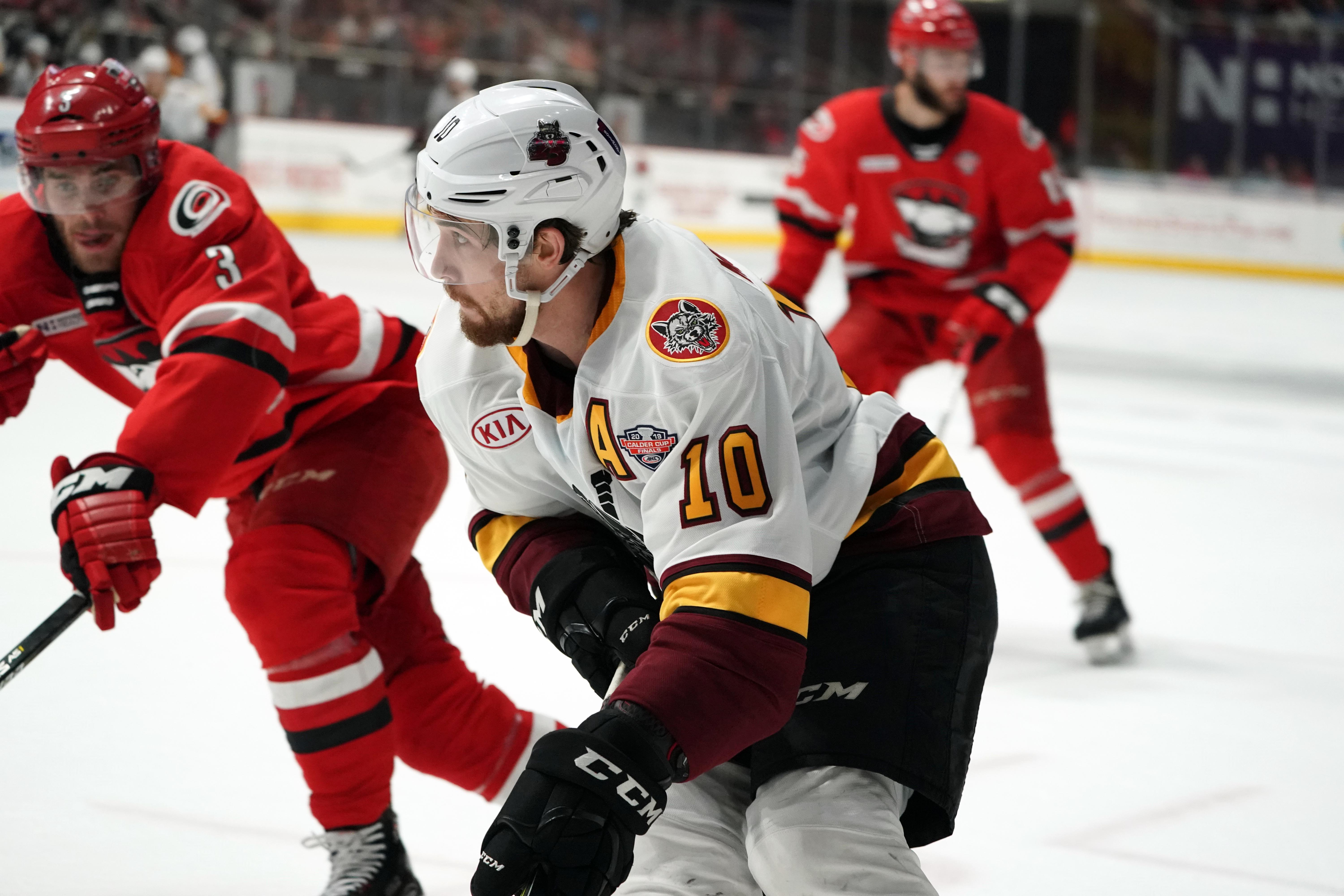
McKenzie with the Chicago Wolves in the 2019 Calder Cup Finals.

After five seasons within the Stars organization, McKenzie left as a free agent and agreed to a two-year, one-way contract with the Vegas Golden Knights on July 1, 2018. After participating in the Golden Knights training camp, McKenzie was assigned to their AHL affiliate, the Chicago Wolves, for the 2018–19 season. While playing alongside T.J. Tynan and Keegan Kolesar, McKenzie maintained a career-high eight-game point streak in February. He finished the regular season ranked third on the team in scoring with 20 goals and 34 assists as the Wolves qualified for the 2019 Calder Cup playoffs. During the Central Division Final against the Iowa Wild, McKenzie recorded his first postseason hat-trick to lead the Wolves to a 3–2 series lead. He scored another goal the following game to advance the Wolves to the Western Conference Final. McKenzie scored two goals in Game 6 against the San Diego Gulls to help the Wolves capture the Western Conference title and qualify for the 2019 Calder Cup Finals. He received a one-game suspension in Game 2 of the Finals for being the aggressor and instigating in the last five minutes. McKenzie finished the playoffs with a team-leading eight goals and 15 points despite playing through an injury.

After participating in the Golden Knights' training camp and preseason, McKenzie was reassigned to the Wolves for the 2019–20 season. In the pandemic-shortened season, McKenzie ranked first on the team in scoring with 17 goals and ranked second in assists with 25.

As a free agent, McKenzie was signed by the St. Louis Blues to a one-year, two-way contract on October 10, 2020. He played the entirety of the 2020–21 season with their AHL affiliate, the Utica Comets, and finished with five goals and 13 points through 26 games.

==== Return to Texas (2021–present) ====
McKenzie opted to return to the Texas Stars as a free agent on August 6, 2021, by signing a two-year contract with the team. He scored the game-tying goal in his 500th career AHL game on December 11, 2021. McKenzie registered his 350th AHL point on February 16, 2022, against the Grand Rapids Griffins. He helped the Stars qualify for the Calder Cup playoffs for the first time since 2018.

McKenzie reached numerous personal milestones through the 2022–23 season while captaining them to the 2023 Calder Cup playoffs. During a lengthy road trip, McKenzie scored his 150th AHL goal on November 23, 2022, against the Rockford IceHogs. He played in his 500th career AHL game on February 19 and recorded his 400th AHL point on April 8. Shortly thereafter, McKenzie helped the Stars clinch the Central Division regular season title by scoring the game-winning goal in overtime against the Iowa Wild on April 15, 2023. He finished the regular season with 22 goals and 32 assists and added five points in eight playoff games. In the final year of his contract, McKenzie scored 15 goals and 15 assists in 67 games. He was also selected as the recipient of the Yanick Dupre Memorial Award as the IOA/American Speciality AHL Man of the Year. On May 31, 2025, McKenzie skated in his 100th Calder Cup playoff game. He re-signed with the Stars on July 3, 2025.

McKenzie scored his 500th career AHL point on March 14, 2026, against Bakersfield. In doing so, he became the 101st player in league history to reach that milestone.

== Personal life ==
McKenzie married Lucia Carr on August 18, 2018, by Lake Louise in Alberta.

While attending Miami University, McKenzie became involved in the You Can Play Project. You Can Play is an initiative to promote equality in sports. In 2016, the NHL adopted its Hockey Is For Everyone night. McKenzie was the Dallas Stars first Ambassador.

== Career statistics ==
Medal record

Ice hockey

Representing Canada West

World Junior A Challenge
Silver medal – second place	2008 Camrose	

			Regular season					Playoffs
Season	Team	League	GP	G	A	Pts	PIM	GP	G	A	Pts	PIM
2007–08	Penticton Vees	BCHL	49	3	7	10	81	7	0	1	1	9
2008–09	Penticton Vees	BCHL	53	30	34	64	90	10	3	7	10	13
2009–10	Miami RedHawks	CCHA	42	6	21	27	88	—	—	—	—	—
2010–11	Miami RedHawks	CCHA	38	7	5	12	57	—	—	—	—	—
2011–12	Miami RedHawks	CCHA	40	5	12	17	60	—	—	—	—	—
2012–13	Miami RedHawks	CCHA	39	11	13	24	80	—	—	—	—	—
2012–13	Texas Stars	AHL	5	0	1	1	14	2	0	0	0	0
2013–14	Texas Stars	AHL	75	27	38	65	92	21	3	11	14	21
2014–15	Texas Stars	AHL	31	6	15	21	46	3	1	1	2	18
2014–15	Dallas Stars	NHL	36	4	1	5	48	—	—	—	—	—
2015–16	Texas Stars	AHL	61	24	31	55	120	4	1	1	2	8
2015–16	Dallas Stars	NHL	3	0	0	0	0	1	0	0	0	5
2016–17	Dallas Stars	NHL	53	6	10	16	72	—	—	—	—	—
2017–18	Texas Stars	AHL	51	25	23	48	74	22	11	9	20	27
2017–18	Dallas Stars	NHL	7	0	2	2	11	—	—	—	—	—
2018–19	Chicago Wolves	AHL	71	20	34	54	112	21	8	7	15	51
2019–20	Chicago Wolves	AHL	61	17	25	42	36	—	—	—	—	—
2020–21	Utica Comets	AHL	26	5	8	13	35	—	—	—	—	—
2021–22	Texas Stars	AHL	72	21	29	50	82	2	0	0	0	4
2022–23	Texas Stars	AHL	70	22	32	54	83	8	3	2	5	4
2023–24	Texas Stars	AHL	63	13	35	48	35	7	2	5	7	8
2024–25	Texas Stars	AHL	67	15	15	30	86	14	5	5	10	10
2025–26	Texas Stars	AHL	72	11	18	29	71	5	1	1	2	4
NHL totals			99	10	13	23	131	1	0	0	0	5

== Awards and honours ==
Award	Year	Refs
AHL
Rookie of the Month (December)	2014	
All-Rookie Team	2014	
Dudley "Red" Garrett Memorial Award	2014	
Calder Cup (Texas Stars)	2014	
All-Star Classic	2025	
Yanick Dupre Memorial Award	2025	

Awards
Preceded by Tyler Toffoli	AHL Rookie of the Year; 2013–14	Succeeded by Matt Murray
