= Mike Hedden =

Canadian ice hockey player

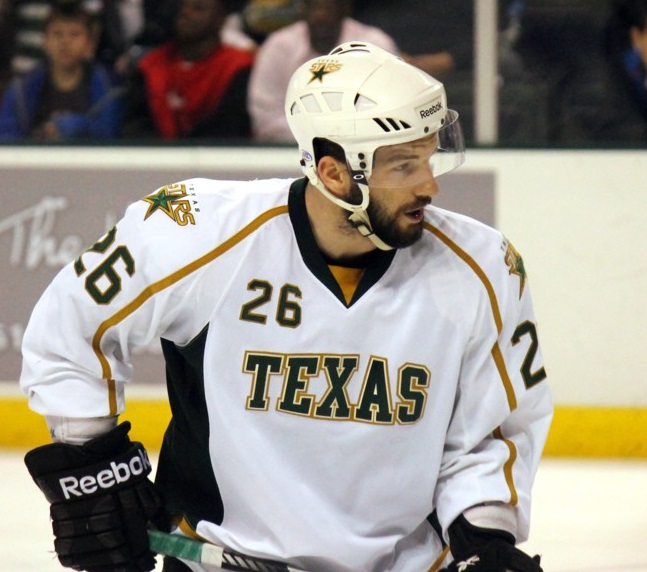
- Hedden with the Texas Stars in 2013
- Born: December 27, 1984 (age 41) Dunnville, Ontario, Canada
- Height: 5 ft 10 in (178 cm)
- Weight: 185 lb (84 kg; 13 st 3 lb)
- Position: Forward
- Shot: Left
- Played for: Grand Rapids Griffins; Rockford IceHogs; Rochester Americans; Texas Stars; KHL Medveščak Zagreb; Ässät; Straubing Tigers; Cardiff Devils
- NHL draft: Undrafted
- Playing career: 2009–2021

Mike Hedden (born December 27, 1984) is a Canadian former professional ice hockey forward who played in the American Hockey League (AHL). He is currently serving as an assistant coach with the Oshawa Generals of the Ontario Hockey League (OHL).

== Playing career ==
Prior to turning professional, Hedden played college hockey at Neumann University. Hedden made his professional debut in the ECHL with the Toledo Walleye in the 2009–10 season.

After impressing with the Walleye, Hedden earned a try-out contract with American Hockey League clubs, Grand Rapids Griffins, Rockford IceHogs, and the Rochester Americans. In the following 2011–12 season, he signed a one-year contract with the Texas Stars.

Hedden established himself alongside the Stars' top offensive players, culminating in capturing the Calder Cup in his third and final season with the club in the 2013–14 season.

On June 20, 2014, Hedden signed his first European contract, agreeing to a one-year deal with Croatian club, KHL Medveščak Zagreb of the Kontinental Hockey League. In the 2014–15 season, Hedden struggled to transition with Zagreb going scoreless in 12 games before he was released from his contract. On October 30, Hedden moved to the Finnish Liiga, signing for the remainder of the season with Ässät Pori.

On May 25, 2015, Hedden left Finland as a free agent, continuing his European career in Germany, signing an initial one-year deal with the Straubing Tigers of the Deutsche Eishockey Liga.

After three seasons in the DEL with Straubing, Hedden left as a free agent to sign a one-year deal with the Cardiff Devils of the Elite Ice Hockey League on July 8, 2018.

Following five European seasons abroad, Hedden returned to North America as a free agent and agreed to play in the ECHL in signing a one-year deal with the Allen Americans on July 9, 2019. He began the 2019–20 season by appearing in 4 games with the Americans before he was claimed off waivers by the Jacksonville Icemen on October 29, 2019.

On August 6, 2020, Hedden continued in the ECHL, agreeing to a one-year deal with the Rapid City Rush. After he was named in the Rush training camp roster, Hedden opted to end his 11-year professional career announcing his retirement on December 1, 2020. A little over a month later, Hedden reversed his decision to retire, returning the Rapid City Rush on January 10, 2021.

In 2021, he was named an assistant coach of the Oshawa Generals in the Ontario Hockey League.

== Career statistics ==
			Regular season					Playoffs
Season	Team	League	GP	G	A	Pts	PIM	GP	G	A	Pts	PIM
2005–06	Neumann University	ECAC-W	25	18	14	32	36	—	—	—	—	—
2006–07	Neumann University	ECAC-W	26	31	21	52	20	—	—	—	—	—
2007–08	Neumann University	ECAC-W	26	30	12	42	14	—	—	—	—	—
2008–09	Neumann University	ECAC-W	31	17	20	37	39	—	—	—	—	—
2009–10	Toledo Walleye	ECHL	66	18	14	32	58	4	0	3	3	6
2010–11	Toledo Walleye	ECHL	57	32	20	52	94	—	—	—	—	—
2010–11	Grand Rapids Griffins	AHL	3	0	1	1	2	—	—	—	—	—
2010–11	Rockford IceHogs	AHL	1	0	0	0	0	—	—	—	—	—
2010–11	Rochester Americans	AHL	2	1	1	2	15	—	—	—	—	—
2011–12	Texas Stars	AHL	69	19	15	34	55	—	—	—	—	—
2012–13	Texas Stars	AHL	61	13	22	35	38	9	1	3	4	4
2013–14	Texas Stars	AHL	74	23	32	55	43	21	9	10	19	20
2014–15	KHL Medveščak Zagreb	KHL	12	0	0	0	9	—	—	—	—	—
2014–15	Ässät	Liiga	39	10	9	19	51	2	0	0	0	4
2015–16	Straubing Tigers	DEL	52	17	17	34	14	7	0	2	2	2
2016–17	Straubing Tigers	DEL	51	18	26	44	52	2	0	0	0	2
2017–18	Straubing Tigers	DEL	52	11	20	31	56	—	—	—	—	—
2018–19	Cardiff Devils	EIHL	59	20	42	62	20	4	1	3	4	0
2019–20	Allen Americans	ECHL	4	1	0	1	2	—	—	—	—	—
2019–20	Jacksonville Icemen	ECHL	44	16	26	42	21	—	—	—	—	—
2020–21	Rapid City Rush	ECHL	42	9	9	18	10	—	—	—	—	—
AHL totals			210	56	71	127	153	30	10	13	23	24

== Awards and honours ==
Award	Year
AHL
Calder Cup (Texas Stars)	2014
