= Brendan Ranford =

Canadian ice hockey player

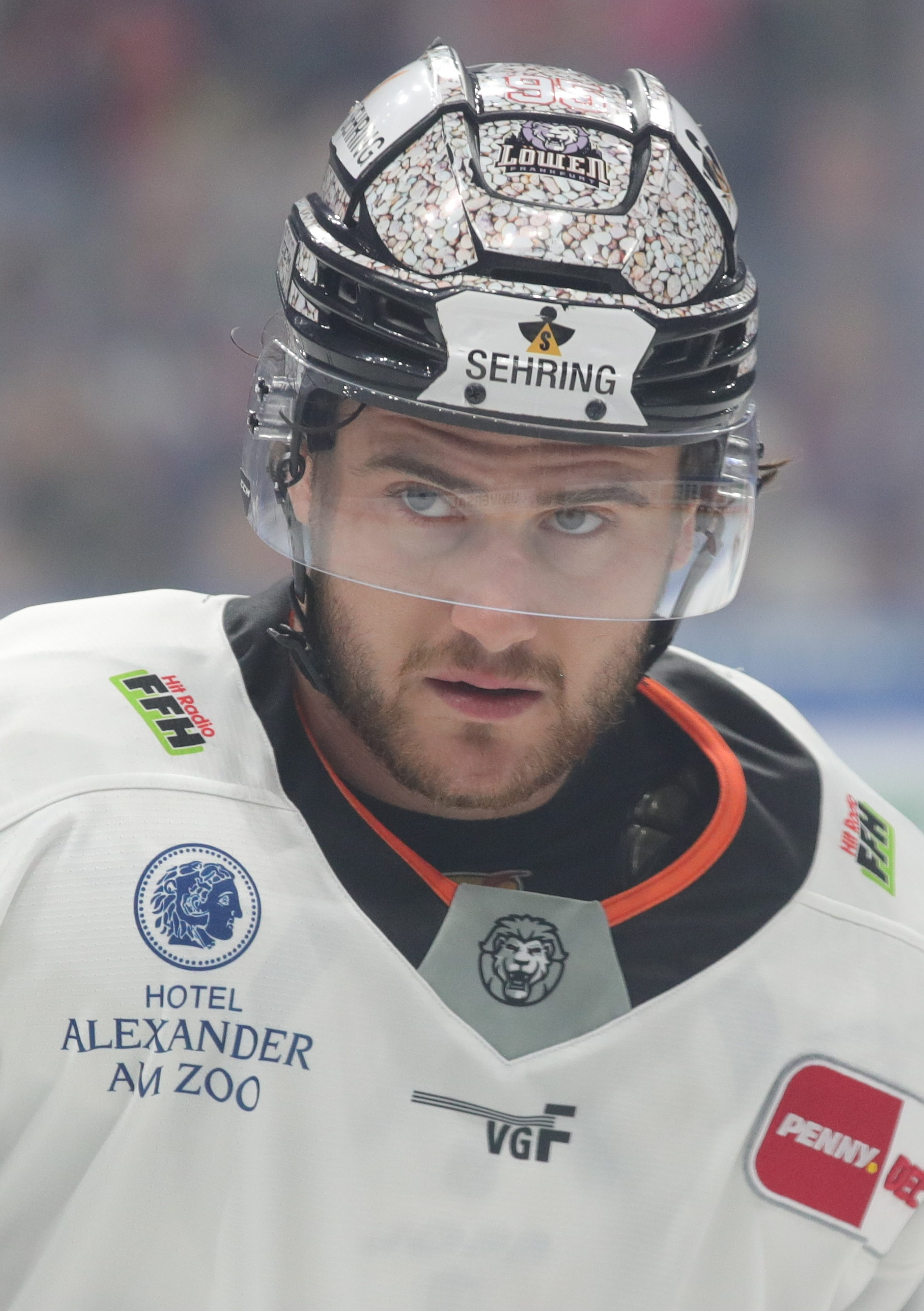
- Ranford with Löwen Frankfurt in 2022
- Born: May 3, 1992 (age 34) Edmonton, Alberta, Canada
- Height: 5 ft 10 in (178 cm)
- Weight: 182 lb (83 kg; 13 st 0 lb)
- Position: Left wing
- Shoots: Left
- Slovak team Former teams: Vlci Žilina; Dallas Stars; Eisbären Berlin; Mora IK; HC Slovan Bratislava; HK 32 Liptovský Mikuláš; Bietigheim Steelers; Löwen Frankfurt
- NHL draft: 209th overall, 2010; Philadelphia Flyers
- Playing career: 2013–present

Brendan Ranford (born May 3, 1992) is a Canadian professional ice hockey forward for Vlci Žilina in the Slovak Extraliga (Slovak).

He was selected 209th overall in the 2010 NHL entry draft by the Philadelphia Flyers. He is the nephew of former National Hockey League goaltender Bill Ranford.

== Playing career ==
=== Junior ===
As a youth, Ranford played in the 2004 and 2005 Quebec International Pee-Wee Hockey Tournaments with a minor ice hockey team from North Vancouver.

Ranford first played junior hockey in his native Edmonton with the Edmonton Canadians in the Alberta Midget Hockey League before he was drafted 15th overall in the 2007 WHL draft by the Kamloops Blazers. Ranford played major junior hockey for parts of six seasons in the Western Hockey League (WHL) with the Kamloops Blazers (2007–08 to 2012–13), registering 137 goals and 220 assists for 357 points, while earning 298 penalty minutes, in 348 WHL regular-season games. He was recognized for his outstanding play when he was named to the 2010–11 Second All-Star Team. Ranford spent the entirety of his major junior career with the Blazers over six seasons, culminating in being selected by the Philadelphia Flyers in the 2010 NHL entry draft.

=== Professional ===
Unsigned from the Flyers and at the beginning of his professional career, Ranford signed a try-out contract with the Texas Stars of the American Hockey League on May 24, 2013, a team owned by Tom Gaglardi who also owned the Blazers. After a successful training camp with Texas, Ranford was signed to a one-year AHL contract to begin his rookie professional season in 2013–14 season. Ranford enjoyed a successful debut season with the Stars, scoring 33 points in 65 games. During the 2014 Calder Cup playoffs Ranford topped all rookies by scoring 16 points as he led his team to capture their first ever Calder Cup.

On July 2, 2014, Ranford was signed as a free agent by NHL affiliate, the Dallas Stars to a three-year entry-level contract.

During the 2016–17 season, in the midst of his fourth year with the Texas Stars, Ranford was traded along with Branden Troock to the Arizona Coyotes in exchange for Justin Peters and Justin Hache on February 1, 2017. Assigned directly to the Tucson Roadrunners, Ranford struggled to show his offensive upside going scoreless in 10 games before he was traded for a second time in a month at the NHL trade deadline. He was dealt by the Coyotes to the Colorado Avalanche in exchange for Joe Whitney on March 1, 2017. He immediately regained his scoring touch with the Rampage, playing out the season to record 17 points in 21 games.

As a free agent from the Avalanche, Ranford still opted to continue within the organization in agreeing to a one-year AHL contract with the Rampage on August 1, 2017.

After a second season with the Rampage, Ranford opted to leave North America as a free agent, agreeing to a one-year contract with German outfit, Eisbären Berlin of the Deutsche Eishockey Liga (DEL) on June 28, 2018.

Ranford continued his career in Europe after his lone season in Berlin, signing as a free agent mid-way into the 2019–20 season with Swedish club, Mora IK of the Allsvenskan on November 20, 2019. He continued his European journeyman career by signing a one-year deal with Slovakian club, HC Slovan Bratislava for the 2020–21 season.

In the 2022–23 season, Ranford joined newly promoted Löwen Frankfurt and formed a top scoring line role alongside Carter Rowney and Dominik Bokk. In Frankfurt's first season in the top tier Ranford contributed with 12 goals and 46 points through 40 regular season games. Following their defeat in the playoff qualifiers to Düsseldorfer EG, Ranford left Frankfurt at the conclusion of his contract on March 19, 2023.

== Family ==
His uncle is the former NHL goaltender Bill Ranford.

== Career statistics ==
=== Regular season and playoffs ===
			Regular season					Playoffs
Season	Team	League	GP	G	A	Pts	PIM	GP	G	A	Pts	PIM
2007–08	Kamloops Blazers	WHL	3	0	0	0	0	—	—	—	—	—
2008–09	Kamloops Blazers	WHL	66	13	14	27	46	4	0	3	3	2
2009–10	Kamloops Blazers	WHL	72	29	36	65	83	4	2	3	5	4
2010–11	Kamloops Blazers	WHL	68	33	53	86	68	—	—	—	—	—
2011–12	Kamloops Blazers	WHL	69	40	52	92	73	11	5	9	14	8
2012–13	Kamloops Blazers	WHL	70	22	65	87	28	15	5	15	20	0
2013–14	Texas Stars	AHL	65	12	21	33	14	21	8	8	16	12
2014–15	Texas Stars	AHL	73	18	33	51	22	3	0	1	1	0
2014–15	Dallas Stars	NHL	1	0	0	0	0	—	—	—	—	—
2015–16	Texas Stars	AHL	76	19	40	59	49	4	1	3	4	4
2016–17	Texas Stars	AHL	36	6	11	17	4	—	—	—	—	—
2016–17	Tucson Roadrunners	AHL	10	0	0	0	4	—	—	—	—	—
2016–17	San Antonio Rampage	AHL	21	4	13	17	8	—	—	—	—	—
2017–18	San Antonio Rampage	AHL	57	4	15	19	26	—	—	—	—	—
2018–19	Eisbären Berlin	DEL	51	13	15	28	48	8	2	3	5	6
2019–20	Mora IK	Allsv	29	11	12	23	14	—	—	—	—	—
2020–21	HC Slovan Bratislava	Slovak	29	12	20	32	8	4	3	1	4	0
2021–22	Bietigheim Steelers	DEL	55	13	36	49	16	—	—	—	—	—
2022–23	Löwen Frankfurt	DEL	40	12	34	46	22	2	0	0	0	0
2023–24	HC Slovan Bratislava	Slovak	36	13	21	34	12	4	2	2	4	0
NHL totals			1	0	0	0	0	—	—	—	—	—

=== International ===
Year	Team	Event	Result	GP	G	A	Pts	PIM
2009	Canada Pacific	U17	2nd place, silver medalist(s)	6	3	4	7	2
Junior totals				6	3	4	7	2

== Awards and honours ==
Award	Year
WHL
(West) Second All-Star Team	2011
AHL
Calder Cup (Texas Stars)	2014
