= Kael Mouillierat =

Canadian ice hockey player (born 1987)

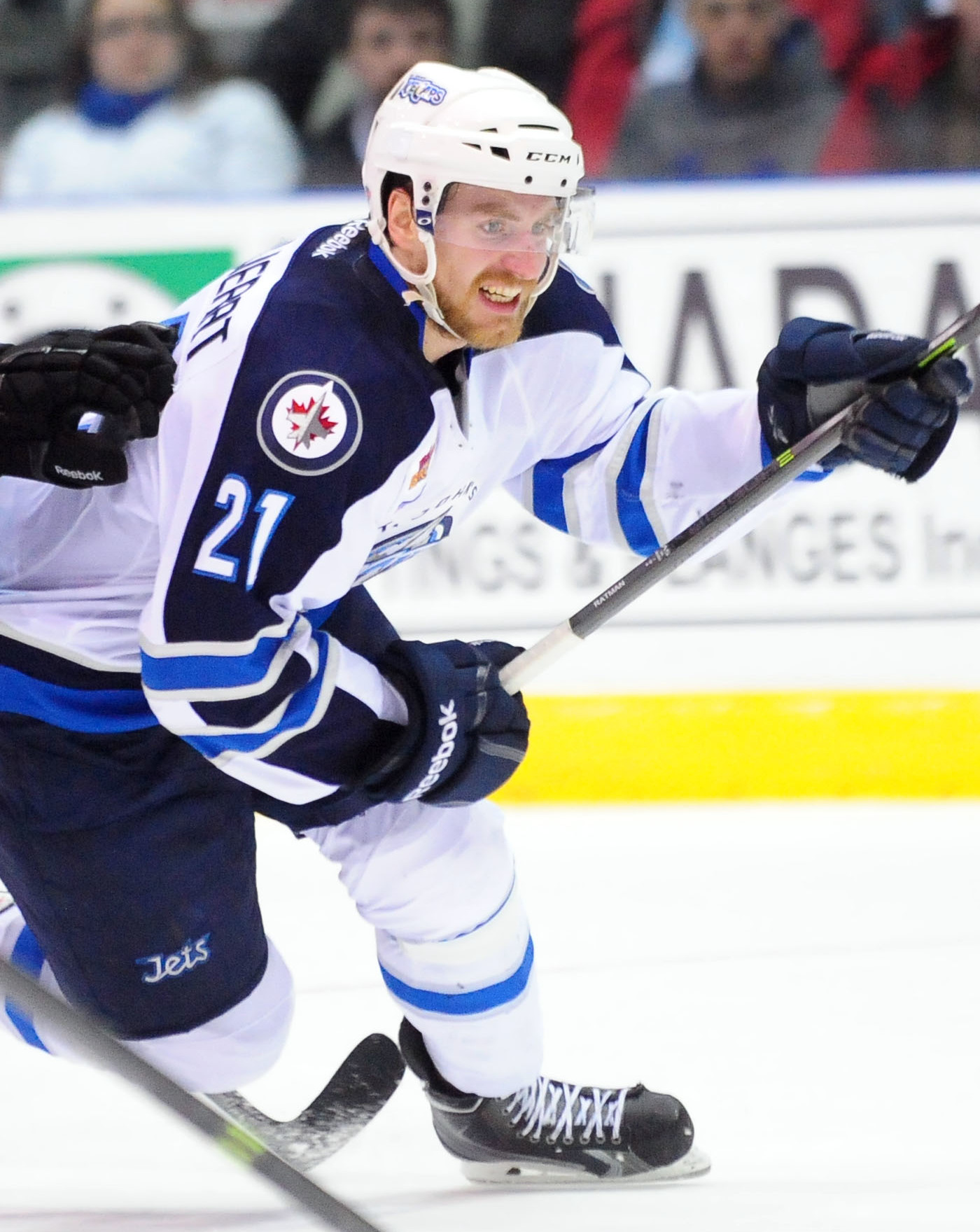
- Born: December 9, 1987 (age 38) Edmonton, Alberta, Canada
- Height: 6 ft 0 in (183 cm)
- Weight: 188 lb (85 kg; 13 st 6 lb)
- Position: Left wing
- Shoots: Left
- DEL2 team Former teams: Krefeld Pinguine; New York Islanders; Pittsburgh Penguins; Luleå HF; ERC Ingolstadt; Straubing Tigers
- NHL draft: Undrafted
- Playing career: 2010–present

Kael Mouillierat (born December 9, 1987) is a Canadian professional ice hockey forward. He is currently playing under contract to the Krefeld Pinguine of the DEL2.

== Playing career ==
Prior to turning professional, Mouillierat attended Minnesota State University, Mankato where he played four seasons in NCAA Division I with the Minnesota State Mavericks men's ice hockey team. On December 16, 2011, the Bridgeport Sound Tigers of the American Hockey League (AHL) signed him to a professional tryout agreement.

After recording a career high 42 points in 50 games with the St. John's IceCaps in the 2012–13 season, Mouillierat re-signed for a second season with the IceCaps, agreeing to a one-year deal on June 14, 2013. Mouillierat continued his steady upward development in the 2013–14 season again totalling career highs with 20 goals and 53 points in only 60 games with the IceCaps. In leading the IceCaps to the Calder Cup finals for the first time in franchise history, Mouillierat gained considerable interest and signed his first NHL contract on a one-year two-way deal with the New York Islanders of the National Hockey League (NHL) on July 1, 2014.

Mouillierat was assigned to the Islanders' AHL affiliate, the Sound Tigers. He spent the majority of the season there before being called up to the Islanders on February 20, 2015, after an injury to Mikhail Grabovski. He recorded his first NHL point (an assist) followed by his first NHL goal on February 24, 2015 against Mike Smith of the Arizona Coyotes.

On July 1, 2015, Mouillierat left the Islanders as a free agent after one season and signed a one-year, two-way contract with the Pittsburgh Penguins.

After spending the entirety of his professional career in North America, on July 21, 2016, Mouillierat opted to pursue an opportunity abroad, agreeing to a one-year contract with Swedish club, Luleå HF of the top-tier Swedish Hockey League. In the 2016–17 season, Mouillierat struggled to find his offensive touch in the Swedish league, compiling just 4 goals and 14 points in 47 games.

At the conclusion of the season, Mouillierat left as a free agent to sign a one-year contract with German club, ERC Ingolstadt of the DEL, on July 17, 2017. After a productive 2017–18 season with Ingolstadt, having posted 31 points in 50 games, Mouillierat opted to continue in the DEL signing a one-year deal with rivals, the Straubing Tigers on April 12, 2018.

Following four seasons with the Straubing Tigers, Mouillierat left the club as a free agent and agreed to join newly relegated Krefeld Pinguine of the DEL2, on May 3, 2022.

== Career statistics ==
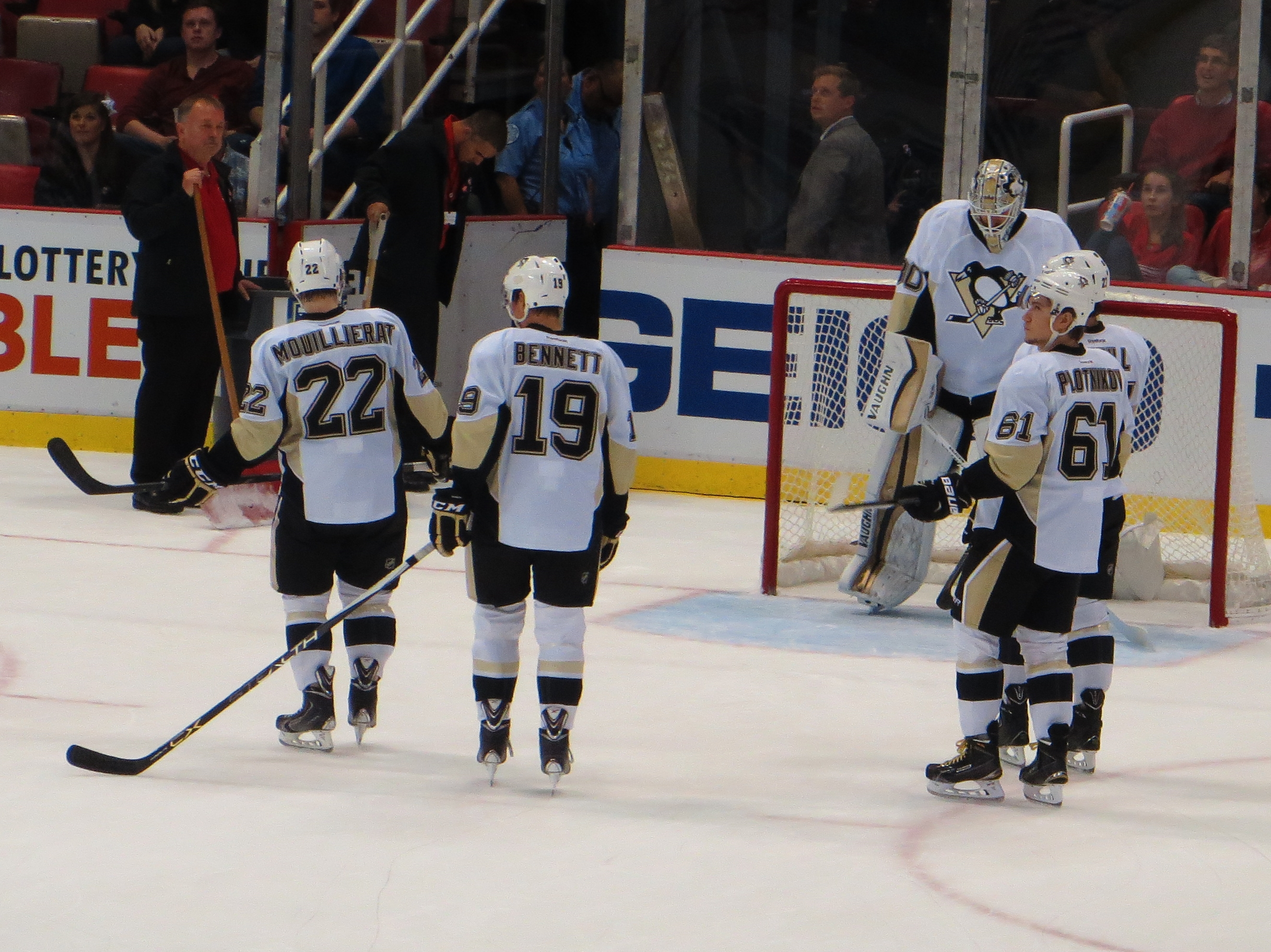
Mouillierat during his tenure with the Penguins.

| | | | Regular season | | | | | Playoffs |
| Season | Team | League | GP | G | A | Pts | PIM | GP | G | A | Pts | PIM |
|---|---|---|---|---|---|---|---|---|---|---|---|---|
| 2004–05 | Drayton Valley Thunder | AJHL | 62 | 30 | 28 | 58 | 105 | — | — | — | — | — |
| 2005–06 | Drayton Valley Thunder | AJHL | 51 | 31 | 40 | 71 | 190 | — | — | — | — | — |
| 2006–07 | Minnesota State U – Mankato | WCHA | 37 | 8 | 7 | 15 | 52 | — | — | — | — | — |
| 2007–08 | Minnesota State U – Mankato | WCHA | 39 | 11 | 11 | 22 | 30 | — | — | — | — | — |
| 2008–09 | Minnesota State U – Mankato | WCHA | 30 | 17 | 13 | 30 | 48 | — | — | — | — | — |
| 2009–10 | Minnesota State U – Mankato | WCHA | 38 | 13 | 12 | 25 | 64 | — | — | — | — | — |
| 2009–10 | Idaho Steelheads | ECHL | 9 | 2 | 0 | 2 | 8 | — | — | — | — | — |
| 2010–11 | Idaho Steelheads | ECHL | 62 | 25 | 38 | 63 | 108 | 8 | 0 | 3 | 3 | 12 |
| 2010–11 | Texas Stars | AHL | 6 | 0 | 2 | 2 | 2 | — | — | — | — | — |
| 2011–12 | Idaho Steelheads | ECHL | 27 | 14 | 13 | 27 | 42 | — | — | — | — | — |
| 2011–12 | Bridgeport Sound Tigers | AHL | 44 | 8 | 15 | 23 | 47 | 2 | 0 | 0 | 0 | 2 |
| 2012–13 | Idaho Steelheads | ECHL | 19 | 14 | 13 | 27 | 29 | — | — | — | — | — |
| 2012–13 | St. John's IceCaps | AHL | 50 | 11 | 31 | 42 | 32 | — | — | — | — | — |
| 2013–14 | St. John's IceCaps | AHL | 60 | 20 | 33 | 53 | 48 | 21 | 7 | 6 | 13 | 18 |
| 2014–15 | Bridgeport Sound Tigers | AHL | 69 | 24 | 26 | 50 | 110 | — | — | — | — | — |
| 2014–15 | New York Islanders | NHL | 6 | 1 | 1 | 2 | 8 | — | — | — | — | — |
| 2015–16 | Wilkes-Barre/Scranton Penguins | AHL | 68 | 18 | 27 | 45 | 89 | 10 | 3 | 4 | 7 | 10 |
| 2015–16 | Pittsburgh Penguins | NHL | 1 | 0 | 0 | 0 | 2 | — | — | — | — | — |
| 2016–17 | Luleå HF | SHL | 47 | 4 | 10 | 14 | 57 | 1 | 0 | 0 | 0 | 2 |
| 2017–18 | ERC Ingolstadt | DEL | 50 | 13 | 18 | 31 | 50 | 5 | 0 | 1 | 1 | 10 |
| 2018–19 | Straubing Tigers | DEL | 51 | 11 | 8 | 19 | 48 | 1 | 0 | 0 | 0 | 2 |
| 2019–20 | Straubing Tigers | DEL | 49 | 14 | 7 | 21 | 81 | — | — | — | — | — |
| 2020–21 | Straubing Tigers | DEL | 36 | 13 | 6 | 19 | 44 | 3 | 0 | 1 | 1 | 2 |
| 2021–22 | Straubing Tigers | DEL | 51 | 11 | 17 | 28 | 57 | 4 | 2 | 0 | 2 | 10 |
| NHL totals | | | 7 | 1 | 1 | 2 | 10 | — | — | — | — | — |

== Awards and honours ==
| Awards | Year |
|---|---|
ECHL
| All-Rookie Team | 2010–11 |
