= Ryan Spooner =

Canadian ice hockey player (born 1992)

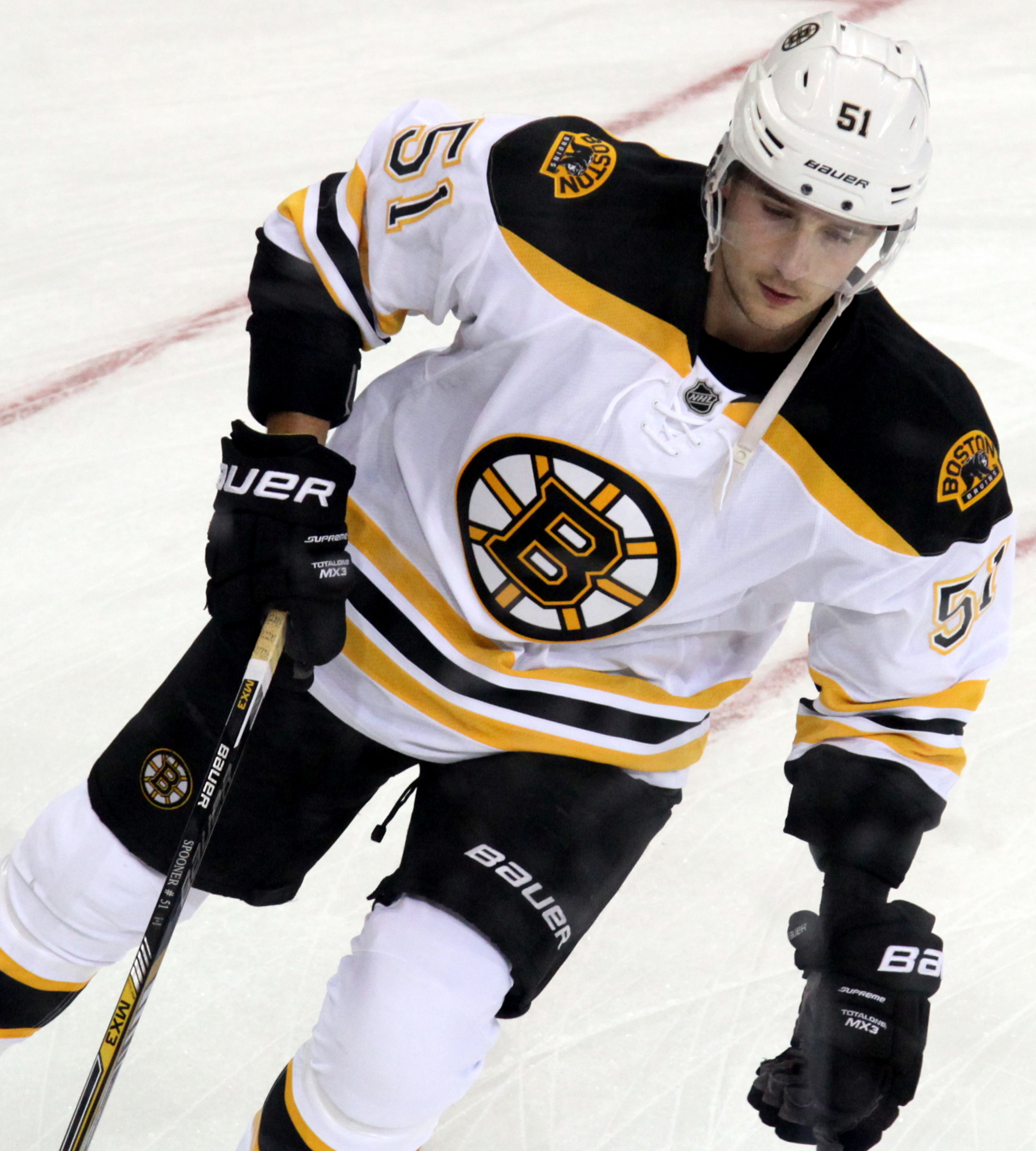
- Spooner with the Boston Bruins in September 2015
- Born: January 30, 1992 (age 34) Ottawa, Ontario, Canada
- Height: 5 ft 11 in (180 cm)
- Weight: 191 lb (87 kg; 13 st 9 lb)
- Position: Centre
- Shoots: Left
- Slovak team Former teams: HK Dukla Trenčín; Boston Bruins; New York Rangers; Edmonton Oilers; Vancouver Canucks; HC Lugano; Dinamo Minsk; Avtomobilist Yekaterinburg; Avangard Omsk; Shanghai Dragons; Lausanne HC
- NHL draft: 45th overall, 2010; Boston Bruins
- Playing career: 2011–present

Ryan Bradley Spooner (born January 30, 1992) is a Canadian professional ice hockey forward who is currently playing for HK Dukla Trenčín of the Slovak Extraliga. He has previously played in the National Hockey League (NHL) for the Boston Bruins, New York Rangers, Edmonton Oilers, and Vancouver Canucks. He was selected by the Boston Bruins in the second round, 45th overall, of the 2010 NHL entry draft.

== Playing career ==
=== Junior ===
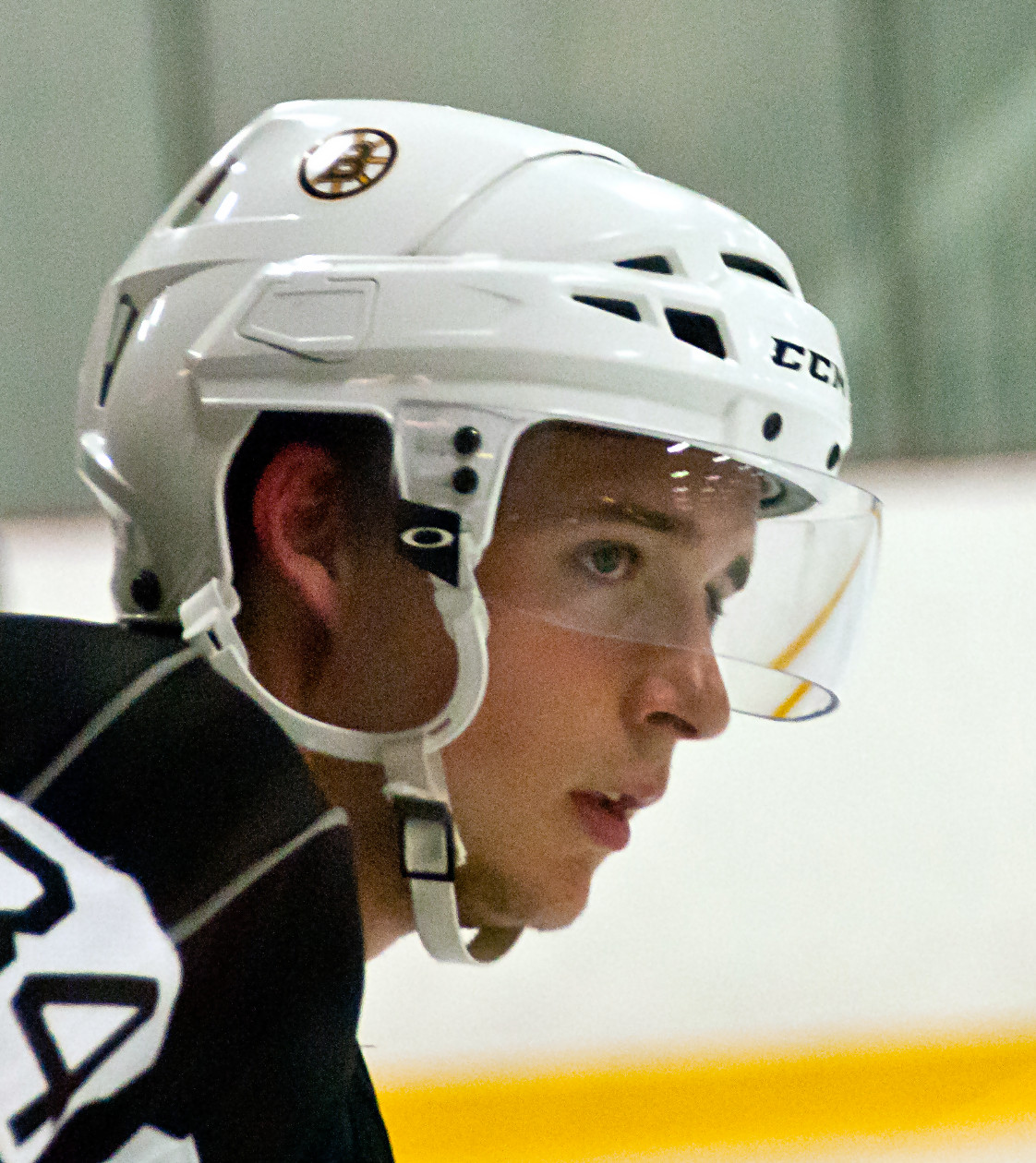
Spooner in July 2011

Spooner was selected fifth overall in the 2008 OHL Bantam Draft by the Peterborough Petes. In his third season with the Petes, on November 11, 2010, Spooner was traded to the Kingston Frontenacs in exchange for Alan Quine, Clark Seymour, a 2011 second-round draft pick and a 2013 second-round draft pick.

On January 5, 2012, Spooner was then traded by the Frontenacs to the Sarnia Sting for Ryan Kujawinski.

=== Professional ===
==== Boston Bruins ====
As a rookie, Spooner led the Providence Bruins of the American Hockey League (AHL), the Boston Bruins' top minor league affiliate, in points, scoring 57 points in 59 games.

Spooner made his NHL debut for Boston on February 6, 2013, against the Montreal Canadiens. Spooner was called up to the Bruins for the first time in the 2013–14 season on October 31, 2013. Playing against the Anaheim Ducks, Spooner assisted on a Carl Söderberg goal to record his first NHL point. Spooner scored his first career NHL goal on February 27, 2015, in overtime to beat the New Jersey Devils 3–2 in a Boston road victory. Spooner's first goal in regulation time came as the first Boston goal in a 3–1 road defeat of the Ottawa Senators on March 10, 2015, with Spooner also scoring a second goal in the same game.

On July 1, 2015, the Boston Bruins re-signed Spooner to a two-year, $1.9 million contract worth $950,000 annually.

On March 6, 2017, in a 4–2 loss to the Ottawa Senators, Spooner suffered a concussion as he was caught with an elbow to the face by Senators' forward Viktor Stålberg, causing him to miss the next three games.

On July 26, 2017, Spooner and the Bruins avoided arbitration by agreeing to a one-year contract extension worth $2.825 million. Spooner scored his 100th NHL career assist on February 11, 2018, assisting on defenceman Torey Krug's second-period goal during a 5–3 victory over the New Jersey Devils.

==== New York Rangers ====
On February 25, Spooner was traded along with Matt Beleskey, Ryan Lindgren, a 2018 first-round pick and a 2019 seventh-round pick to the New York Rangers in exchange for Rick Nash. On July 31, 2018, as a restricted free agent Spooner signed to a two-year deal with the Rangers.

==== Edmonton Oilers ====
Spooner struggled to replicate his initial success with the Rangers to begin the 2018–19 season, posting 2 points in 16 games before he was traded to the Edmonton Oilers in exchange for Ryan Strome on November 16, 2018. His offensive woes continued with the Oilers, registering just 2 goals in 24 games before he was placed on waivers by the Oilers on January 21, 2019. After clearing waivers, Spooner was later re-assigned to affiliate, the Bakersfield Condors, on January 23, marking his first return to the AHL since 2015.

==== Vancouver Canucks ====
Spooner played in 7 games with the streaking Condors, posting 6 points, before he was traded by the Edmonton Oilers to the Vancouver Canucks in exchange for Sam Gagner on February 16, 2019. Remaining on the NHL roster, Spooner played out the remainder of the season registering 4 assists in 11 games for the Canucks.

With the Canucks in need of salary cap relief, Spooner was placed on unconditional waivers and bought out from the remaining year on his contract on June 30, 2019.

==== Europe ====
As a free agent, Spooner opted to pause his NHL career, agreeing to a one-year European contract with Swiss club, HC Lugano of the NL on July 17, 2019. Spooner was a healthy scratch for most of the beginning of the season, appearing in only 2 games (1 assist) through Lugano's first 14 regular season games. With no intention from the coaching staff to reinsert Spooner into the lineup, he joined HC Dinamo Minsk of the Kontinental Hockey League (KHL) on October 21, 2019.

Following two seasons with Dinamo Minsk, Spooner left as a free agent continuing in the KHL in signing a one-year contract with Russian club, Avtomobilist Yekaterinburg on May 11, 2021.

At the conclusion of his contract with Avtomobilist, Spooner returned for a second stint with Dinamo Minsk, signing a one-year contract on June 15, 2022. Following a return to a top scoring line role with Minsk, Spooner responded with career best of 19 goals along with 28 assists for 47 points in 64 games.

Spooner continued his tenure in the KHL in the 2023–24 season, moving on a one-year contract to Russian club, Avangard Omsk, on August 6, 2023.

On August 16, 2025, after two seasons with Avangard, Spooner continued his career in the KHL by moving to newly rebranded Shanghai Dragons on a one-year contract for the 2025–26 season. On December 20, 2025 it was reported that Shanghai Dragons and Spooner have mutually agreed to terminate the contract.

On January 6, 2026 Spooner joined Lausanne HC for the remainder of the season.

On September 2, 2026, Spooner signed with HK Dukla Trenčín of the Slovak Extraliga.

== Career statistics ==
=== Regular season and playoffs ===
			Regular season					Playoffs
Season	Team	League	GP	G	A	Pts	PIM	GP	G	A	Pts	PIM
2008–09	Peterborough Petes	OHL	62	30	28	58	8	4	0	1	1	0
2009–10	Peterborough Petes	OHL	47	19	35	54	12	3	0	1	1	2
2010–11	Peterborough Petes	OHL	14	10	9	19	2	—	—	—	—	—
2010–11	Kingston Frontenacs	OHL	50	25	37	62	6	5	4	2	6	2
2010–11	Providence Bruins	AHL	3	2	1	3	0	—	—	—	—	—
2011–12	Kingston Frontenacs	OHL	27	14	18	32	8	—	—	—	—	—
2011–12	Sarnia Sting	OHL	30	15	19	34	8	6	1	2	3	8
2011–12	Providence Bruins	AHL	5	1	3	4	0	—	—	—	—	—
2012–13	Providence Bruins	AHL	59	17	40	57	14	12	2	3	5	4
2012–13	Boston Bruins	NHL	4	0	0	0	0	—	—	—	—	—
2013–14	Providence Bruins	AHL	49	11	35	46	8	12	6	9	15	2
2013–14	Boston Bruins	NHL	23	0	11	11	6	—	—	—	—	—
2014–15	Boston Bruins	NHL	29	8	10	18	2	—	—	—	—	—
2014–15	Providence Bruins	AHL	34	8	18	26	10	5	0	4	4	0
2015–16	Boston Bruins	NHL	80	13	36	49	35	—	—	—	—	—
2016–17	Boston Bruins	NHL	78	11	28	39	14	4	0	2	2	0
2017–18	Boston Bruins	NHL	39	9	16	25	2	—	—	—	—	—
2017–18	New York Rangers	NHL	20	4	12	16	2	—	—	—	—	—
2018–19	New York Rangers	NHL	16	1	1	2	0	—	—	—	—	—
2018–19	Edmonton Oilers	NHL	25	2	1	3	2	—	—	—	—	—
2018–19	Bakersfield Condors	AHL	7	2	4	6	6	—	—	—	—	—
2018–19	Vancouver Canucks	NHL	11	0	4	4	0	—	—	—	—	—
2019–20	HC Lugano	NL	2	0	1	1	0	—	—	—	—	—
2019–20	Dinamo Minsk	KHL	43	10	27	37	6	—	—	—	—	—
2020–21	Dinamo Minsk	KHL	36	6	33	39	14	—	—	—	—	—
2021–22	Avtomobilist Yekaterinburg	KHL	45	11	23	34	24	—	—	—	—	—
2022–23	Dinamo Minsk	KHL	64	19	28	47	16	6	1	4	5	0
2023–24	Avangard Omsk	KHL	65	23	38	61	10	10	1	5	6	4
2024–25	Avangard Omsk	KHL	54	8	31	39	18	13	2	1	3	2
2025–26	Shanghai Dragons	KHL	31	5	15	20	6	—	—	—	—	—
2025–26	Lausanne HC	NL	6	0	1	1	2	—	—	—	—	—
2025–26	Dinamo Minsk	KHL	8	0	9	9	4	3	0	0	0	2
NHL totals			325	48	119	167	63	4	0	2	2	0
KHL totals			346	82	204	286	98	32	4	10	14	8

=== International ===
Year	Team	Event	Result	GP	G	A	Pts	PIM
2009	Canada Ontario	U17	1st place, gold medalist(s)	6	4	6	10	0
2010	Canada	U18	7th	6	2	0	2	2
Junior totals				12	6	6	12	2

== Awards and honours ==
Award	Year
OHL
Second All-Rookie Team	2009
William Hanley Trophy	2010
CHL Top Prospects Game	2010
AHL
All-Rookie Team	2013
