= Travis Morin =

American ice hockey center (born 1984)

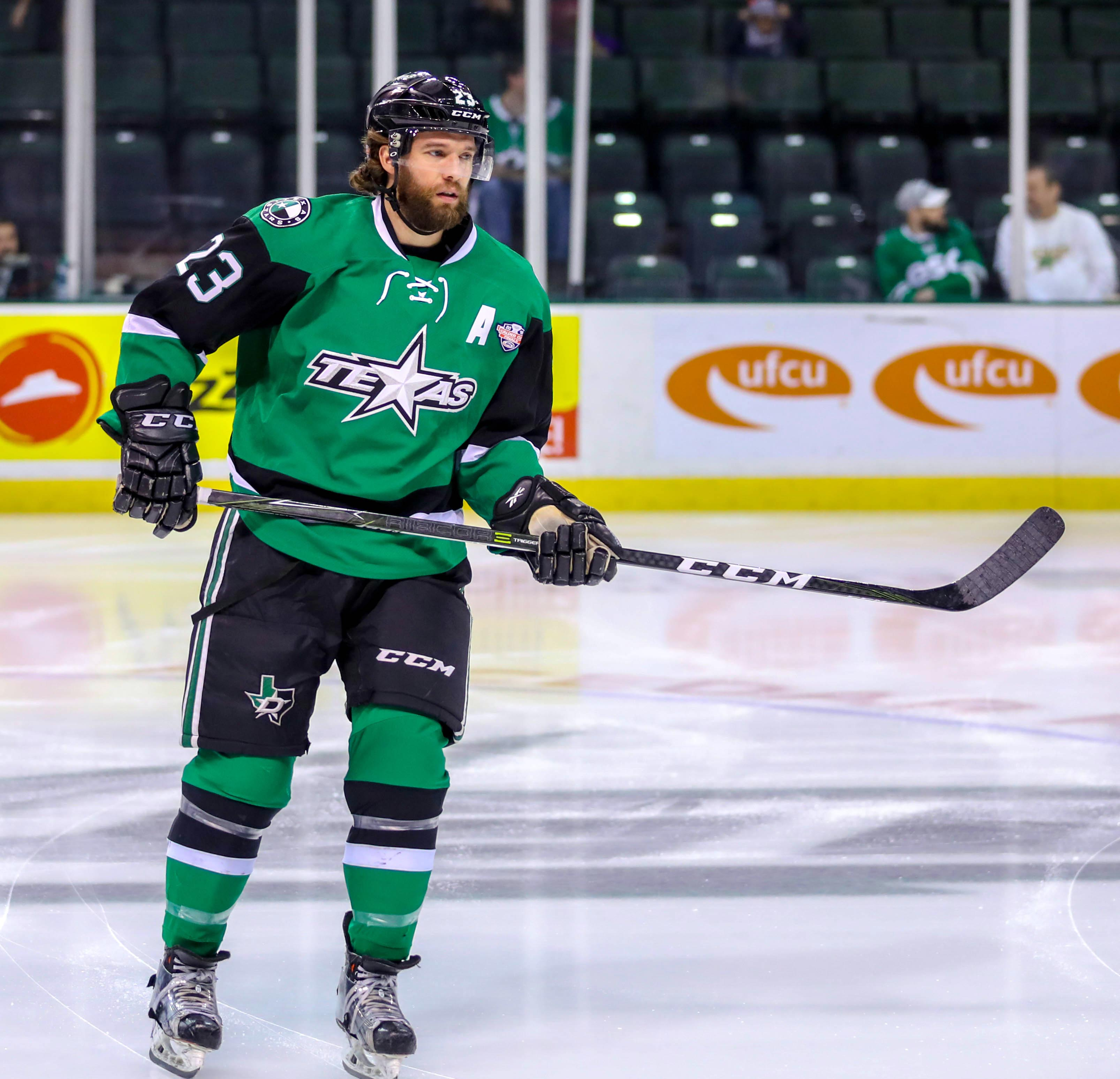
- Morin with the Texas Stars in 2018
- Born: January 9, 1984 (age 42) Brooklyn Park, Minnesota, U.S.
- Height: 6 ft 2 in (188 cm)
- Weight: 200 lb (91 kg; 14 st 4 lb)
- Position: Center
- Shot: Left
- Played for: Dallas Stars
- NHL draft: 263rd overall, 2004; Washington Capitals
- Playing career: 2007–2019

Travis Andrew Morin (born January 9, 1984) is an American former professional ice hockey center and current assistant coach. While he briefly played in the National Hockey League (NHL) with the Dallas Stars, he most notably played with the Stars' American Hockey League (AHL) affiliate, the Texas Stars. Morin appeared in 686 games for the Texas Stars across 10 seasons and had his jersey retired by the team following his retirement in 2019.

== Early life ==
Morin was born on January 9, 1984, in Brooklyn Park, Minnesota. He began playing organized hockey at the age of five and competed in the Brooklyn Park youth system through bantams.

== Playing career ==
=== Amateur ===
While enrolled at Osseo Senior High School, Morin competed with their varsity ice hockey team from 1999 to 2002. After making the varsity squad as a sophomore in 1999, Morin helped them clinch second place at the state championship. In his junior year, Morin helped the Orioles maintain a 17–7–3 record and finish second in the newly founded Northwest Suburban Conference. Before the start of his senior year at Osseo, Morin committed to play collegiate ice hockey with the Minnesota State Mavericks at Minnesota State University, Mankato. He finished the 2001–02 season with 26 goals and 40 assists to help the Orioles finish with a 21–7 record. His 66 points also usurped Trent Klatt's school record as the program's all-time point leader. Morin was also named a finalist for the Minnesota Mr. Hockey Award and chosen for the All-Metro First Team. He was also selected as the 2002 Metro Player of the Year by the Minneapolis Star Tribune. Once his high school career ended, Morin joined the Chicago Steel of the United States Hockey League (USHL).

Despite going unranked by the NHL Central Scouting Bureau, Morin was selected by the Washington Capitals in the 9th round, 263rd overall, in the 2004 NHL entry draft.

=== Collegiate ===
Morin competed with the Minnesota State Mavericks at Minnesota State University, Mankato, from 2003 to 2007, where he recorded 58 goals and 75 assists.

=== Professional ===
==== South Carolina Stingrays and Hershey Bears (2007–2009) ====
After college, Morin played for the South Carolina Stingrays in the ECHL and Hershey Bears in the American Hockey League (AHL). He was assigned to the Stingrays from Hershey on September 27, 2007, after performing poorly in their training camp. Morin accumulated eight goals and 13 points with the Stingrays before being called up to their AHL affiliate, Hershey Bears, on November 5, 2007. Despite missing a few games, Morin ended November with the team lead in scoring and was named to the ECHL's American Conference All-Star Team. He finished his rookie season with 34 goals and 50 assists through 68 ECHL games and 0 points through four AHL games.

Morin returned to the Stingrays for the 2008–09 season, where he led the team in points. He was recalled to the AHL in April and scored his first AHL point, an assist, on April 13, 2009. He finished the regular season with 24 goals and 62 assists through 70 games and was named to the All-ECHL First Team. Despite missing four playoff games due to a wrist injury, Morin led the team with 22 points enroute to the 2009 Kelly Cup championship.

==== Texas Stars (2009–2019) ====
Morin joined the AHL's Texas Stars on a 25-game tryout contract for the 2009–10 season after being recruited by Stars general manager Scott White. While he originally struggled upon joining the Stars, Morin's offensive picked up as the season progressed. After scoring only 15 points in his first 33 games, Morin finished with a team-leading 27 goals and 58 points. As the Stars qualified for the 2010 Calder Cup playoffs, Morin scored seven assists in their first-round sweep of the Rockford IceHogs. He scored in Game 7 of the West Division semifinals, but went goalless for eight consecutive games before breaking the streak in Game 2 of the Calder Cup Finals. Morin finished the playoffs with four goals and 12 assists through 24 games. He then signed a one-year, two-way contract with the Stars' NHL affiliate, Dallas Stars, on July 12, 2010.

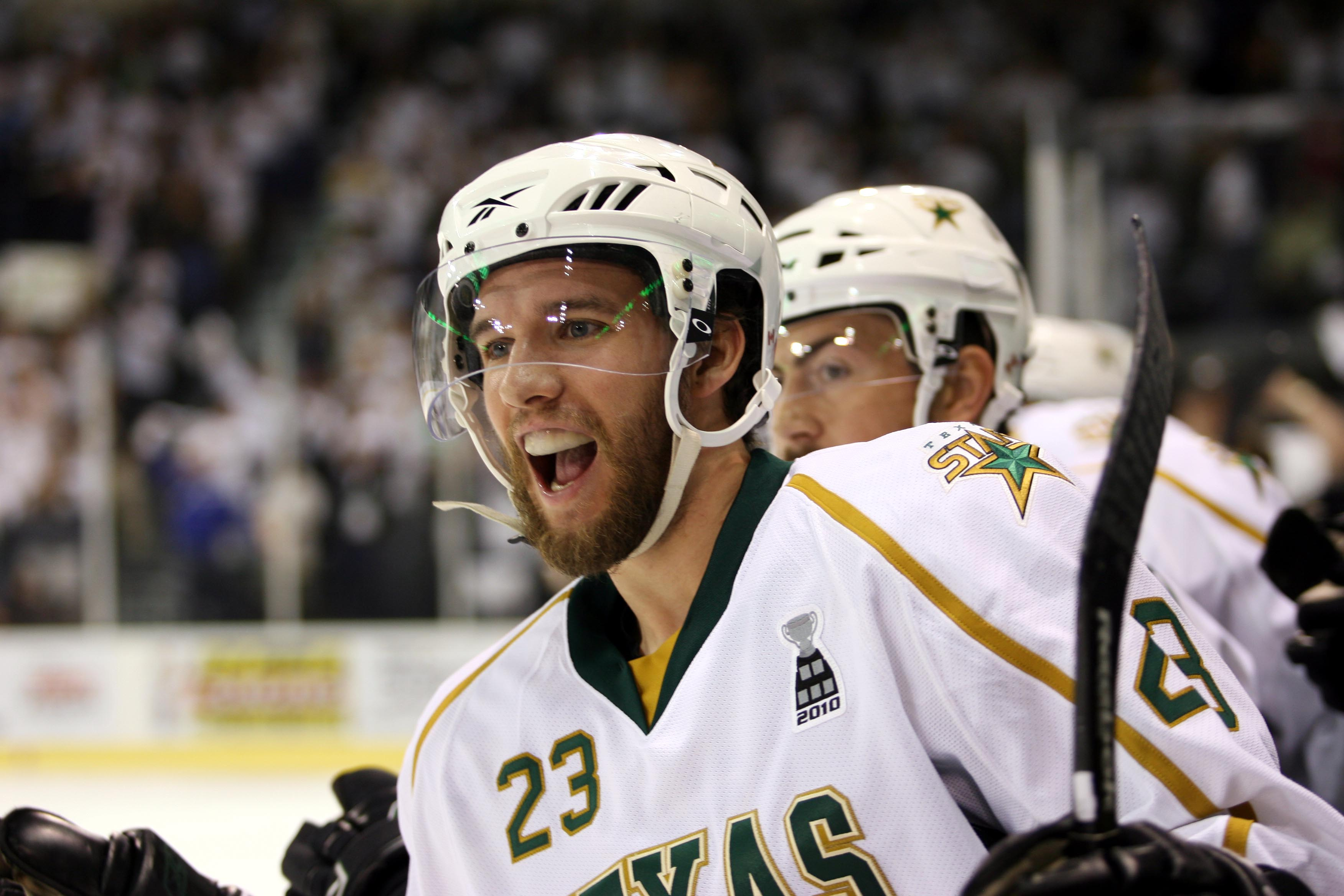
Morin during the 2010 Calder Cup Finals.

Morin started the 2010–11 season with the Texas Star and quickly led the team in scoring. After recording a team-high 13 goals and 17 assists, Morin was named a starter for the Western Conference All-Star team at the 2011 AHL All-Star Classic. Shortly after this, Morin made his NHL debut on January 26, 2011, against the Edmonton Oilers. He played one more game for the Dallas Stars before fainting and falling into a wall at the airport. After being transported to a hospital, he was cleared to return to the lineup. Morin appeared in one more game for Dallas before returning to the AHL on February 6. He finished the regular season with 21 goals and 24 assists to help the Stars qualify for the 2011 Calder Cup playoffs. Morin scored three goals in the playoffs before the Stars were eliminated from contention by the Milwaukee Admirals. He then signed a two-year contract extension with the Dallas Stars on June 9, 2011.

Morin returned to the Stars for the 2013–14 season as their franchise's all-time leading scorer. He scored two goals and four points in the Stars' season opener against the Chicago Wolves on October 5, 2013. He scored a point in each of the team's games in October and finished the month leading the league with eight goals and 11 assists. As a result, he was named the CCM/AHL Player of the Month for October. Morin recorded his first career AHL hat-trick on January 11 in win over the Utica Comets. He then tied a franchise record with four assists and five points in a win over the Charlotte Checkers on January 17. Morin ended the month as the league leader in goals and points and was named the CCM/AHL Player of the Month for January. He subsequently became the second player in AHL history to be named Player of the Month twice in one season. Shortly thereafter, Morin tied both his personal and franchise record for points in a single season. He finished the regular-season with a league leading 88 points and won both the Les Cunningham Award and John B. Sollenberger Trophy. His efforts helped the Stars finish the season with a league-best 48–18–10 record. Morin was also named to the AHL's First All-Star Team. He again led the Texas Stars to the Calder Cup finals in 2014; the Stars would win the Calder Cup, and Morin was awarded the Jack A. Butterfield Trophy as the Most Valuable Player during the Cup finals.

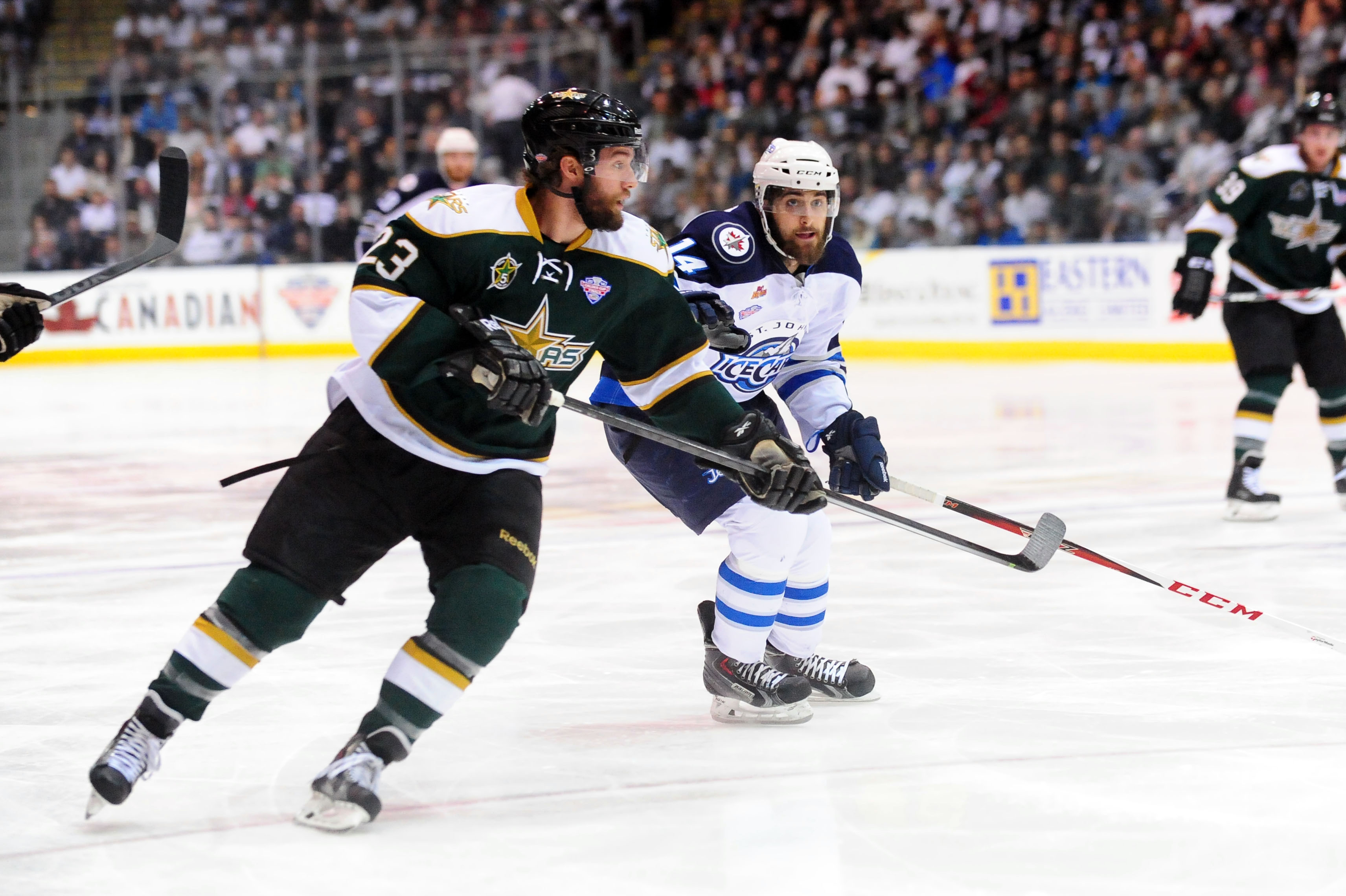
Morin (left) during Game 4 of the 2014 Calder Cup Finals.

Midway through the 2014–15 season, Morin signed a two-year contract extension with the Dallas Stars.

On May 19, 2017, as an impending free agent, Morin opted to continue his tenure with Texas, signing a one-year AHL contract.

After his 12th year in professional hockey, and 10th with Texas, Morin announced his retirement from playing on July 31, 2019, accepting a position within the Texas Stars as both a skills development coach in hockey operations and in a business development and community outreach role in the front office.

He finished his career as the Texas Stars leader in games played, goals, assists and points and was announced to be the first player to have his number retired by Texas during the 2019–20 season on October 19, 2019.

== Personal life ==
Morin and his wife, Lindsey, have three sons together.

== Career statistics ==
| | | | Regular season | | | | | Playoffs |
| Season | Team | League | GP | G | A | Pts | PIM | GP | G | A | Pts | PIM |
|---|---|---|---|---|---|---|---|---|---|---|---|---|
| 1999–2000 | Osseo Senior High School | HS-MN | 20 | 22 | 30 | 52 | | — | — | — | — | — |
| 2000–01 | Osseo Senior High School | HS-MN | 20 | 22 | 31 | 53 | | — | — | — | — | — |
| 2001–02 | Osseo Senior High School | HS-MN | 20 | 23 | 31 | 54 | | — | — | — | — | — |
| 2001–02 | Chicago Steel | USHL | 20 | 5 | 8 | 13 | 0 | 4 | 0 | 0 | 0 | 2 |
| 2002–03 | Chicago Steel | USHL | 60 | 21 | 26 | 47 | 46 | — | — | — | — | — |
| 2003–04 | Minnesota State Mavericks | WCHA | 38 | 9 | 12 | 21 | 14 | — | — | — | — | — |
| 2004–05 | Minnesota State Mavericks | WCHA | 36 | 12 | 19 | 31 | 20 | — | — | — | — | — |
| 2005–06 | Minnesota State Mavericks | WCHA | 39 | 20 | 22 | 42 | 16 | — | — | — | — | — |
| 2006–07 | Minnesota State Mavericks | WCHA | 38 | 17 | 22 | 39 | 34 | — | — | — | — | — |
| 2006–07 | South Carolina Stingrays | ECHL | 8 | 2 | 1 | 3 | 0 | — | — | — | — | — |
| 2007–08 | South Carolina Stingrays | ECHL | 68 | 34 | 50 | 84 | 30 | 20 | 10 | 7 | 17 | 18 |
| 2007–08 | Hershey Bears | AHL | 4 | 0 | 0 | 0 | 0 | — | — | — | — | — |
| 2008–09 | South Carolina Stingrays | ECHL | 71 | 26 | 62 | 88 | 46 | 19 | 4 | 18 | 22 | 12 |
| 2008–09 | Hershey Bears | AHL | 1 | 0 | 1 | 1 | 0 | — | — | — | — | — |
| 2009–10 | Texas Stars | AHL | 80 | 21 | 31 | 52 | 30 | 24 | 4 | 12 | 16 | 6 |
| 2010–11 | Texas Stars | AHL | 64 | 21 | 24 | 45 | 30 | 6 | 3 | 4 | 7 | 0 |
| 2010–11 | Dallas Stars | NHL | 3 | 0 | 0 | 0 | 0 | — | — | — | — | — |
| 2011–12 | Texas Stars | AHL | 76 | 13 | 53 | 66 | 46 | — | — | — | — | — |
| 2012–13 | Texas Stars | AHL | 59 | 12 | 32 | 44 | 14 | 7 | 0 | 3 | 3 | 4 |
| 2013–14 | Texas Stars | AHL | 66 | 32 | 56 | 88 | 52 | 21 | 9 | 13 | 22 | 12 |
| 2013–14 | Dallas Stars | NHL | 4 | 0 | 1 | 1 | 0 | — | — | — | — | — |
| 2014–15 | Texas Stars | AHL | 63 | 22 | 41 | 63 | 40 | 3 | 0 | 0 | 0 | 0 |
| 2014–15 | Dallas Stars | NHL | 6 | 0 | 0 | 0 | 0 | — | — | — | — | — |
| 2015–16 | Texas Stars | AHL | 63 | 15 | 39 | 54 | 36 | 4 | 0 | 1 | 1 | 8 |
| 2016–17 | Texas Stars | AHL | 72 | 21 | 34 | 55 | 42 | — | — | — | — | — |
| 2017–18 | Texas Stars | AHL | 75 | 10 | 51 | 61 | 36 | 22 | 7 | 8 | 15 | 16 |
| 2018–19 | Texas Stars | AHL | 68 | 8 | 24 | 32 | 34 | — | — | — | — | — |
| AHL totals | | | 691 | 175 | 386 | 561 | 360 | 87 | 23 | 41 | 64 | 46 |
| NHL totals | | | 13 | 0 | 1 | 1 | 0 | — | — | — | — | — |

== Awards and honors ==
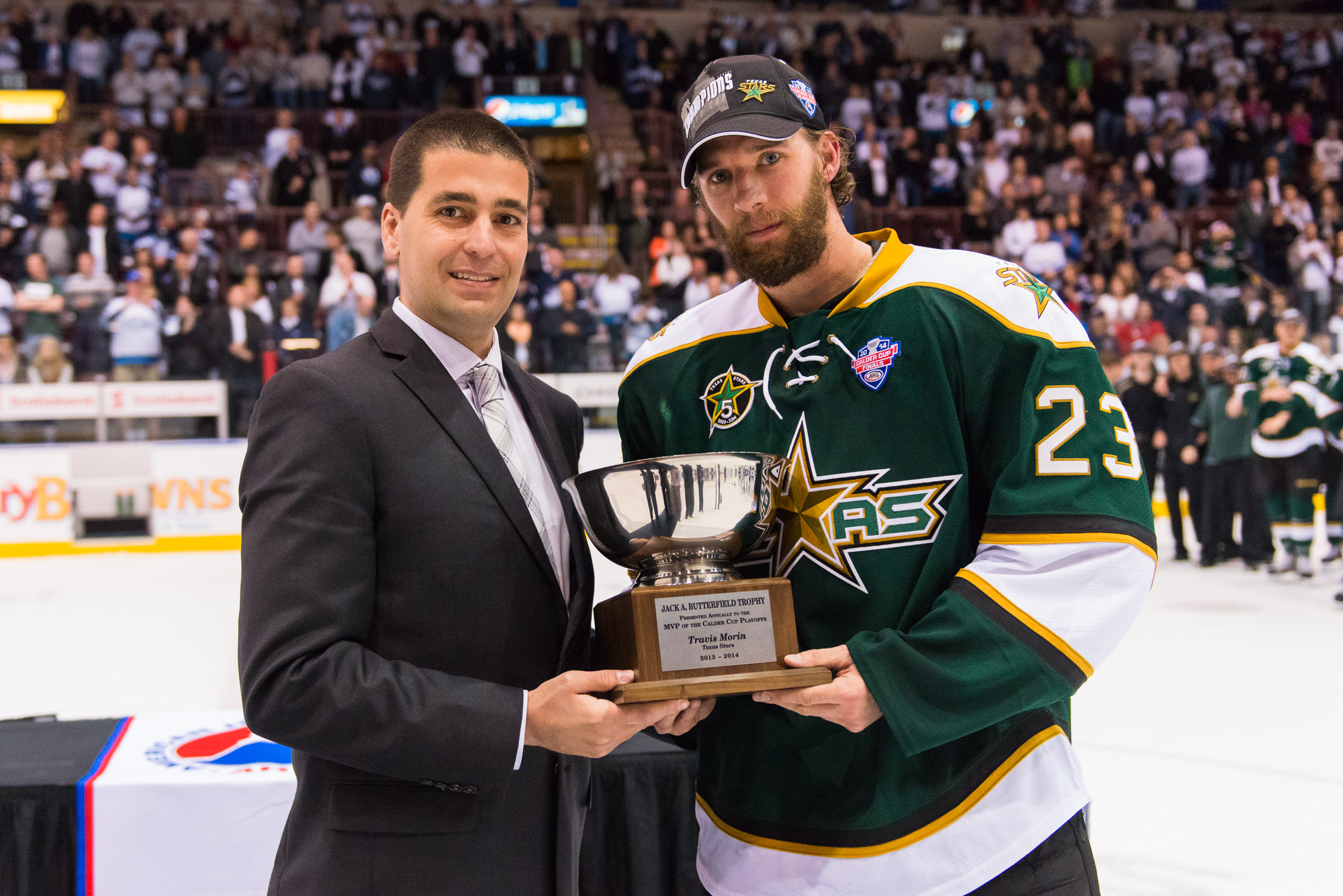
Morin with the 2014 Jack A. Butterfield Trophy.

| Award | Year |
|---|---|
College
| All-WCHA Second Team | 2007 |
ECHL
| Rookie of the Month (November) | 2007 |
| Performer of the Year (+37) | 2009 |
| First All-Star Team | 2009 |
| Kelly Cup (South Carolina Stingrays) | 2009 |
| Sportsmanship Award | 2009 |
AHL
| Player of the Month (October) | 2013 |
| Player of the Month (January) | 2014 |
| All-Star Game | 2014, 2016 |
| Calder Cup (Texas Stars) | 2014 |
| Jack A. Butterfield Trophy | 2014 |
| First All-Star Team | 2014 |
| Les Cunningham Award | 2014 |
| John B. Sollenberger Trophy | 2014 |
