= 2009–10 WHL season =

- League: Western Hockey League
- Sport: Ice hockey
- Duration: Regular season September 17, 2009 – March 14, 2010; Playoffs; March 18 – May 7, 2010
- Teams: 22
- TV partner(s): Shaw TV, FSN Northwest, Rogers Sportsnet

Regular season
- Scotty Munro Memorial Trophy: Calgary Hitmen (4)
- Season MVP: Jordan Eberle (Regina Pats)
- Top scorer: Brandon Kozun (Calgary Hitmen)

Playoffs
- Playoffs MVP: Martin Jones (Hitmen)
- Finals champions: Calgary Hitmen (2)
- Runners-up: Tri-City Americans

WHL seasons
- 2008–09 2010–11

2009–10 CHL season
- League: Canadian Hockey League
- Sport: Ice hockey
- Duration: OHL; 2009-09-17 – 2010-03-14; QMJHL; 2009-09-10 – 2010-03-14; WHL; 2009-09-17 – 2010-03-14
- Teams: 60
- TV partner(s): RDS, Rogers Sportsnet, Rogers TV, Shaw TV, FSN Northwest
- Season MVP: Jordan Eberle (Regina Pats) (WHL)
- Top scorer: Brandon Kozun (Calgary Hitmen) (WHL)

Memorial Cup
- Finals champions: Windsor Spitfires (OHL) (2nd title)
- Runners-up: Brandon Wheat Kings (WHL)

The 2009–10 WHL season was the 44th season of the Western Hockey League (WHL). The regular season began on September 17, 2009, and ended on March 14, 2010. The 2009 Subway Super Series, featuring Team WHL versus Team Russia, took place mid-season from November 25 to 26, 2009. The Calgary Hitmen won their second consecutive and fourth overall Scotty Munro Memorial Trophy for best regular season record. The playoffs took place from March 18 to May 7. The Hitmen followed up their regular season title by defeating the Tri-City Americans in the championship series to claim their second Ed Chynoweth Cup, and a berth in the 2010 Memorial Cup tournament.

== League notes ==
Off-season

- May 27, 2009 — The WHL announced an extended partnership with Shaw TV for an additional five years through the 2013–14 season.
- May 28, 2009 — 13 WHL players were invited to Canada's National Men's Summer Under-18 Selections Camp.
- May 29, 2009 — 11 WHL players were invited to the Hockey Canada's National Junior Team Development Camp.
- June 17, 2009 — The WHL Board of Governors agreed to adopt video-replay during the regular season and playoffs commencing with the 2009–10 season. The WHL introduced video replay during the 2009 playoffs. With the decision, the WHL expanded its officiating development program to include video training centres for referees and additional linesmen training camps throughout Western Canada.
- June 17, 2009 — The WHL Board of Governors adopted a new player recruitment strategy, including the hiring of a Director of Player Recruitment focusing on promoting the WHL Scholarship program and other benefits of playing in the WHL to top prospects in Western Canada and the United States.
- June 17, 2009 — The WHL Board of Governors announced the introduction of a series of new online post-secondary education initiatives to improve players' access to University courses while they are playing in the WHL starting in the 2009–10 season. The new initiative was done through the support of the WHL Alumni Association and the league's corporate sponsorship.
- June 21, 2009 — Prince Albert Raiders broadcaster Morley Jaeger died at the age of 72.
- July 3, 2009 —18 WHL graduates Invited to Hockey Canada's National Men's Team Orientation Camp in Calgary.
- July 20, 2009 — The 1989 Memorial Cup champion Swift Current Broncos team was inducted into the Swift Current Broncos Hall of Fame.
- July 29, 2009 — Alberta announced $17.8 million to support the completion of Lethbridge's Enmax Centre Expansion project.
- August 14, 2009 — Canada's National Men's Summer Under-18 Team claimed first place at the 2009 Ivan Hlinka tournament, with a 9–2 win over Russia.
- August 17, 2009 — Former Prince Albert Raiders team president, John Odnokon, died at the age of 78.

Pre-season

- August 31, 2009 — The Canadian Hockey League announced an expanded corporate sponsorship deal with Subway. Through this agreement the ADT Canada-Russia Challenge was renamed the Subway Super Series three years.
- September 9, 2009 — All 22 teams in the WHL unveiled new Reebok Edge jerseys.

Regular season

- September 17, 2009 — Due to enhanced in-house video production from all 22 teams, the WHL was able to show all 792 regular season games online for the first time.
- September 25, 2009 —The WHL and Hockey Alberta enhanced their partnership to include joint programming initiatives and additional financial support for minor hockey and high performance programs in Alberta.
- October 13, 2009 — The WHL launched WHL Mobile, a mobile-optimized version of its website designed specifically for users of web-enabled smartphones.
- December 3, 2009 — Ten players from the WHL were invited to Team Canada's Selection Camp roster for the 2010 World Junior Ice Hockey Championships.
- December 23, 2009 — The WHL announced a multi-year deal with FSN Northwest to broadcast WHL games starting immediately.
- January 10, 2010 — WHL Trade Deadline ended with 15 trades.
- January 15, 2010 — The WHL and BC Hockey announced a new partnership providing additional financial support for the hockey system in the province of British Columbia and the Yukon territory.
- January 20, 2010 — The 2010 CHL Top Prospects Game was held in Windsor, Ontario.
- February 6, 2010 — Brendan Burke died in an automobile accident in the United States during a snow storm. For the remainder of the season, the Chilliwack Bruins—who were partly owned by Burke's father, Brian Burke, wore a commemorative patch on their jerseys.

== Regular season ==
The Western Hockey League opened the regular season on September 17, 2009, in Kelowna, with a game between the defending champion Kelowna Rockets and the Vancouver Giants.

=== Standings ===
Map of WHL, 2007–08 to 2010–11
East Division
Central Division
BC Division
US Division

==== Conference standings ====
Eastern Conference
Pos	Team	Pld	W	L	OTL	SOL	GF	GA	Pts
1	x, z – Calgary Hitmen	72	52	17	1	2	269	177	107
2	x, z – Brandon Wheat Kings	72	50	18	1	3	321	204	104
3	x – Saskatoon Blades	72	46	19	3	4	258	226	99
4	x – Kootenay Ice	72	43	24	3	2	252	215	91
5	x – Medicine Hat Tigers	72	41	23	3	5	276	232	90
6	x – Red Deer Rebels	72	39	28	0	5	202	222	83
7	x – Swift Current Broncos	72	37	30	1	4	231	232	79
8	x – Moose Jaw Warriors	72	33	27	6	6	243	247	78
9	Prince Albert Raiders	72	32	35	3	2	229	249	69
10	Regina Pats	72	30	35	3	4	246	278	67
11	Lethbridge Hurricanes	72	20	44	5	3	178	275	48
12	Edmonton Oil Kings	72	16	43	4	9	169	285	45

x – clinched playoff spot; z – cliched division

Western Conference
Pos	Team	Pld	W	L	OTL	SOL	GF	GA	Pts
1	x, z – Tri-City Americans	72	47	22	1	2	272	193	97
2	x, z – Vancouver Giants	72	41	25	3	3	267	211	88
3	x – Everett Silvertips	72	46	21	3	2	232	175	97
4	x – Spokane Chiefs	72	45	22	3	2	240	179	95
5	x – Portland Winterhawks	72	44	25	2	1	266	241	91
6	x – Kelowna Rockets	72	35	31	2	4	224	225	76
7	x – Kamloops Blazers	72	32	33	2	5	237	284	71
8	x – Chilliwack Bruins	72	32	33	2	5	215	239	71
9	Seattle Thunderbirds	72	19	41	7	5	172	255	50
10	Prince George Cougars	72	12	56	1	3	172	327	28

x – cliched playoff spot; z – clinched division

==== Division standings ====
East Division
Pos	Team	Pld	W	L	OTL	SOL	GF	GA	Pts
1	x, z – Brandon Wheat Kings	72	50	18	1	3	321	204	104
2	x – Saskatoon Blades	72	46	19	3	4	258	226	99
3	x – Swift Current Broncos	72	37	30	1	4	231	232	79
4	x – Moose Jaw Warriors	72	33	27	6	6	243	247	78
5	Prince Albert Raiders	72	32	35	3	2	229	249	69
6	Regina Pats	72	30	35	3	4	246	278	67

x – clinched playoff spot; z – cliched division

Central Division
Pos	Team	Pld	W	L	OTL	SOL	GF	GA	Pts
1	x, z – Calgary Hitmen	72	52	17	1	2	269	177	107
2	x – Kootenay Ice	72	43	24	3	2	252	215	91
3	x – Medicine Hat Tigers	72	41	23	3	5	276	232	90
4	x – Red Deer Rebels	72	39	28	0	5	202	222	83
5	Lethbridge Hurricanes	72	20	44	5	3	178	275	48
6	Edmonton Oil Kings	72	16	43	4	9	169	285	45

x – clinched playoff spot; z – cliched division

B.C. Division
Pos	Team	Pld	W	L	OTL	SOL	GF	GA	Pts
1	x, z – Vancouver Giants	72	41	25	3	3	267	211	88
2	x – Kelowna Rockets	72	35	31	2	4	224	225	76
3	x – Kamloops Blazers	72	32	33	2	5	237	284	71
4	x – Chilliwack Bruins	72	32	33	2	5	215	239	71
5	Prince George Cougars	72	12	56	1	3	172	327	28

x – clinched playoff spot; z – cliched division

U.S. Division
Pos	Team	Pld	W	L	OTL	SOL	GF	GA	Pts
1	x, z – Tri-City Americans	72	47	22	1	2	272	193	97
2	x – Everett Silvertips	72	46	21	3	2	232	175	97
3	x – Spokane Chiefs	72	45	22	3	2	240	179	95
4	x – Portland Winterhawks	72	44	25	2	1	266	241	91
5	Seattle Thunderbirds	72	19	41	7	5	172	255	50

x – clinched playoff spot; z – cliched division

=== Scoring leaders ===
Note: GP = Games played; G = Goals; A = Assists; Pts. = Points; PIM = Penalty minutes

Player	Team	GP	G	A	Pts.	PIM
Brandon Kozun	Calgary Hitmen	65	32	75	107	50
Jordan Eberle	Regina Pats	57	50	56	106	32
Jordan Weal	Regina Pats	72	35	67	102	54
Matt Calvert	Brandon Wheat Kings	68	47	52	99	70
Brayden Schenn	Brandon Wheat Kings	59	34	65	99	55
Craig Cunningham	Vancouver Giants	72	37	60	97	44
Mitch Wahl	Spokane Chiefs	72	30	66	96	96
Dustin Sylvester	Kootenay Ice	68	35	58	93	41
Cody Eakin	Swift Current Broncos	70	47	44	91	71
Scott Glennie	Brandon Wheat Kings	66	32	57	89	50

=== Leading goaltenders ===
Note: GP = Games played; Mins = Minutes played; W = Wins; L = Losses; OTL = Overtime losses; SOL = Shootout Losses; SO = Shutouts; GAA = Goals against average; Sv% = Save percentage

Player	Team	GP	Mins	W	L	OTL	SOL	SO	GAA	Sv%
Martin Jones	Calgary Hitmen	48	2851	36	11	0	1	8	2.21	.919
Kent Simpson	Everett Silvertips	34	1938	22	9	1	0	1	2.26	.925
Thomas Heemskerk	Everett Silvertips	42	2415	24	12	2	2	4	2.34	.927
James Reid	Spokane Chiefs	60	3514	38	16	3	2	5	2.41	.920
Drew Owsley	Tri-City Americans	50	2776	33	11	1	1	4	2.51	.918

== Players ==
=== 2009 NHL entry draft ===
In total, 31 WHL players were selected at the 2009 NHL entry draft.

1st Round
#	Nat.	Player	WHL team	NHL team
4	(Canada)	Evander Kane	Vancouver Giants	Atlanta Thrashers
5	(Canada)	Brayden Schenn	Brandon Wheat Kings	Los Angeles Kings
8	(Canada)	Scott Glennie	Brandon Wheat Kings	Dallas Stars
9	(Canada)	Jared Cowen	Spokane Chiefs	Ottawa Senators
29	(Canada)	Carter Ashton	Lethbridge Hurricanes	Tampa Bay Lightning

2nd Round
#	Nat.	Player	WHL team	NHL team
32	(Canada)	Landon Ferraro	Red Deer Rebels	Detroit Red Wings
48	(Canada)	Brett Ponich	Portland Winterhawks	St. Louis Blues
49	(Canada)	Stefan Elliott	Saskatoon Blades	Colorado Avalanche

3rd Round
#	Nat.	Player	WHL team	NHL team
64	(Canada)	Tyson Barrie	Kelowna Rockets	Colorado Avalanche
66	(Canada)	Brayden McNabb	Kootenay Ice	Buffalo Sabres
74	(Canada)	Ryan Howse	Chilliwack Bruins	Calgary Flames
81	(Canada)	Adam Morrison	Saskatoon Blades	Philadelphia Flyers
82	(Canada)	Cameron Abney	Everett Silvertips	Edmonton Oilers
85	(Canada)	Cody Eakin	Swift Current Broncos	Washington Capitals
86	(Canada)	Ryan Button	Prince Albert Raiders	Boston Bruins

4th Round
#	Nat.	Player	WHL team	NHL team
96	(Canada)	Linden Vey	Medicine Hat Tigers	Los Angeles Kings
103	(Canada)	Kris Foucault	Calgary Hitmen	Minnesota Wild
105	(Canada)	Justin Weller	Red Deer Rebels	Phoenix Coyotes
108	(Canada)	Tyler Shattock	Kamloops Blazers	St. Louis Blues
119	(Canada)	Byron Froese	Everett Silvertips	Chicago Blackhawks

5th Round
#	Nat.	Player	WHL team	NHL team
129	(Czech Republic)	Tomas Vincour	Edmonton Oil Kings	Dallas Stars

6th Round
#	Nat.	Player	WHL team	NHL team
155	(Canada)	Jimmy Bubnick	Kamloops Blazers	Atlanta Thrashers
157	(Canada)	Evan Bloodoff	Kelowna Rockets	Phoenix Coyotes
161	(Canada)	Darcy Kuemper	Red Deer Rebels	Minnesota Wild
175	(Canada)	Garrett Mitchell	Regina Pats	Washington Capitals
179	(Canada)	Brandon Kozun	Calgary Hitmen	Los Angeles Kings
180	(Canada)	Mitchell Callahan	Kelowna Rockets	Detroit Red Wings

7th Round
#	Nat.	Player	WHL team	NHL team
185	(Canada)	Levko Koper	Spokane Chiefs	Atlanta Thrashers
189	(Canada)	Marek Viedensky	Prince George Cougars	San Jose Sharks
201	(Canada)	Gaelan Patterson	Saskatoon Blades	Calgary Flames
208	(Finland)	Tommi Kivisto	Red Deer Rebels	Carolina Hurricanes

=== Contracts and scholarships ===
- May 15, 2009 — Steven Hodges and Kade Pilton sign WHL Player Contracts with the Chilliwack Bruins.
- May 18, 2009 — Derrick Pouliot signs a WHL Players Contract with the Portland Winterhawks.
- May 18, 2009 — Morgan Rielly signs a WHL Players Contract with the Moose Jaw Warriors.
- May 22, 2009 — Mike Winther signs a WHL Players Contract with the Prince Albert Raiders.
- May 24, 2009 — Ryan Olsen signs a WHL Players Contract with the Saskatoon Blades.
- May 27, 2009 — Griffin Reinhart signs a WHL Players Contract with the Edmonton Oil Kings.
- May 30, 2009 — WHL Grads Jesse Deckert and Brandon Lockerby commits to the Manitoba Bisons.
- June 3, 2009 — WHL Grad Justin McCrae commits to the UBC Thunderbirds.
- June 3, 2009 — Josh Smith signs a WHL Players Contract with the Prince George Cougars.
- June 6, 2009 — Connor Rankin signs a WHL Players Contract with the Tri-City Americans.
- June 8, 2009 — Troy Bourke signs a WHL Players Contract with the Prince George Cougars.
- June 8, 2009 — WHL Grad Carter Smith commits to the Regina Cougars.
- June 10, 2009 — Dave Hunchak signs a WHL Players Contract with the Moose Jaw Warriors.
- June 16, 2009 — WHL Grad Ian Duval commits to the Manitoba Bisons.
- June 19, 2009 — Nicholas Walters signs a WHL Educational Contract with the Everett Silvertips.
- June 25, 2009 — WHL Grads Eric Frere, Graham Potuer, Luke Egener commits to the Calgary Dinos.
- June 29, 2009 — WHL Grad Chad Erb commits to the Manitoba Bisons.
- July 8, 2009 — WHL Grad Tyler Swystun commits to the Calgary Dinos.
- July 11, 2009 — Taylor Aronson, Spencer Bennett, and Seth Swenson sign WHL Players Contracts with the Portland Winterhawks.
- July 16, 2009 — WHL Grad Partik Bhungal commits to the Regina Cougars.
- July 21, 2009 — WHL Grad Scott Wasden commits to the UBC Thunderbirds.
- July 21, 2009 — WHL Grads Joey Perricone, Spencer McAvoy, and Brennen Wray commits to the StFX X-Men.
- July 29, 2009 — Kevin Connauton signs a WHL Players Contract with the Vancouver Giants.
- August 4, 2009 — Taylor Leier and Nino Niederreiter sign WHL Player Contracts with the Portland Winterhawks.
- August 7, 2009 — Andrew Bailey, Brennan Bosch, Kyle Bortis, Kyle Ross, Cody Hobbs, Brett Ward, and David Reekie commits to the Saskatchewan Huskies.
- August 9, 2009 — WHL Grads Colin Joe, Ian Barteaux, Travis Yonkman, Sean Ringrose and Michael MacAngus commits to the Alberta Golden Bears.
- August 9, 2009 — WHL Grads Taylor Procyshen, Jeff Lee and Ben Wright commits to the UNB Varsity Reds.
- August 12, 2009 — Josh Hanson signs a WHL Players Contract with the Portland Winterhawks.
- August 18, 2009 — WHL Grad Mike Reich commits to the STU Tommies.
- August 19, 2009 — Ryan Johansen signs a WHL Players Contract with the Portland Winterhawks.
- August 24, 2009 — Dalton Sward and Matthieu Bellerive sign WHL Players Contracts with the Vancouver Giants.
- August 25, 2009 — Brett Cote, Turner Popoff, Brandon Magee, Zane Jones, Matt Bissett, and Travis Belhorad sign Standard WHL Education Contracts with the Chilliwack Bruins.
- August 25, 2009 — Chandler Stephenson and Tayler Balog sign WHL Players Contracts with the Regina Pats.
- August 27, 2009 — WHL Grad Cale Jefferies commits to the Guelph Gryphons.
- August 27, 2009 — Andrew Sullivan, Andy Blanke, Adam Lowry and Shea Howorko sign WHL Players Contracts with the Swift Current Broncos.
- August 28, 2009 — Mitchell Moroz signs WHL Players Contract with the Edmonton Oil Kings.
- August 31, 2009 — Dane Muench and Graeme Craig sign WHL Players Contracts with the Swift Current Broncos.

=== Trades ===
2009–10 WHL trades
Date	Deal made	
June 18, 2009	Chilliwack Bruins	Swift Current Broncos
June 18, 2009	4th Round Pick →	← Zach Habscheid
June 18, 2009	CWK trades 4th round pick in the 2010 WHL Bantam Draft – SC trades Habscheid.	
June 29, 2009	Calgary Hitmen	Vancouver Giants
June 29, 2009	7th Round Pick →	← Misha Fisenko
June 29, 2009	CGY trades 7th Round Pick in the 2011 WHL Bantam Draft – VAN trades Misha Fisenko.	
June 30, 2009	Red Deer Rebels	Brandon Wheat Kings
June 30, 2009	1st Round Pick, 14th overall →	← Nathan Green ← 1st Round Pick, 41st overall (previous trade from Medicine Hat)
June 30, 2009	RDR trades 1st round, 14th overall Pick in CHL Import Draft – BRN trades Nathan Green and 1st round, 41st overall Pick in CHL Import Draft.	
July 6, 2009	Prince Albert Raiders	Prince George Cougars
July 6, 2009	James Dobrowolski → 4th Round Pick →	← Justin Mayland ← 6th Round Pick
July 6, 2009	PA trades Dobrowolski and 4th Round Pick in 2010 WHL Bantam Draft – PG trades Mayland and 6th Round Pick in the 2010 WHL Bantam Draft.	
July 8, 2009	Calgary Hitmen	Portland Winterhawks
July 8, 2009	conditional Draft Pick →	← Ryan Kerr
July 8, 2009	CGY trades conditional draft pick in the 2010 WHL Bantam Draft – POR trades Ryan Kerr.	
July 13, 2009	Vancouver Giants	Kootenay Ice
July 13, 2009	5th Round Draft Pick → 1st Round Draft Pick →	← David Musil
July 13, 2009	VAN trades 5th Round Draft Pick in the 2010 WHL Bantam Draft and 1st Round Draft Pick in the 2011 Bantam Draft – KTN trades the playing rights of David Musil.	
August 21, 2009	Brandon Wheat Kings	Prince George Cougars
August 21, 2009	James Priestner → Conditional 5th Round Pick →	← Aaron Ness ← 3rd Round Pick
August 21, 2009	BRN trades James Priestner and conditional 5th Round Draft Pick in the 2011 WHL Bantam Draft – PG trades playing rights to Aaron Ness and 3rd Draft Pick in the 2011 WHL Bantam Draft.	
September 1, 2009	Everett Silvertips	Chilliwack Bruins
September 1, 2009	conditional draft pick →	← Luke Siemens
September 1, 2009	EVT trades conditional draft pick in the 2010 WHL Bantam Draft – CWK trades Luke Siemens.	
September 2, 2009	Kootenay Ice	Swift Current Broncos
September 2, 2009	Fourth Round Pick →	← Ryan Molle
September 2, 2009	KTN trades Fourth Round Pick in the 2010 WHL Bantam Draft – SC trades Ryan Molle.	
September 3, 2009	Kamloops Blazers	Vancouver Giants
September 3, 2009	Third Round Pick →	← Bronson Maschmeyer
September 3, 2009	KAM trades Third Round Pick in the 2010 WHL Bantam Draft – VAN trades Bronson Maschmeyer.	
September 8, 2009	Tri-City Americans	Kelowna Rockets
September 8, 2009	Warren Shymko →	← Future Considerations
September 8, 2009	TRI trades Warren Shymko – KEL trades Future Considerations.	
September 8, 2009	Prince Albert Raiders	Edmonton Oil Kings
September 8, 2009	conditional draft pick →	← Craig McCallum
September 8, 2009	PA trades a conditional draft pick in the 2010 WHL Bantam Draft – EDM trades Craig McCallum.	
September 13, 2009	Prince George Cougars	Kamloops Blazers
September 13, 2009	6th Round Pick →	← Kurt Torbohm
September 13, 2009	PG trades a 6th Round Draft Pick in the 2011 WHL Bantam Draft – KAM trades Kurt Torbohm.	
September 15, 2009	Red Deer Rebels	Vancouver Giants
September 15, 2009	3rd Round Pick →	← Simon Witt
September 15, 2009	RDR trades a 3rd Round Draft Pick in the 2011 WHL Bantam Draft – VAN trades Simon Witt.	
September 15, 2009	Prince George Cougars	Saskatoon Blades
September 15, 2009	Tyler Kizuik →	← Conditional 6th Round Draft Pick
September 15, 2009	PG trades Tyler Kizuik – SAS trades a 3rd Round Draft Pick in the 2011 WHL Bantam Draft.	
September 15, 2009	Everett Silvertips	Red Deer Rebels
September 15, 2009	conditional Draft Pick →	← Brett Miller
September 15, 2009	EVT trades a conditional Draft Pick in the 2010 WHL Bantam Draft – RDR trades Brett Miller.	
September 22, 2009	Lethbridge Hurricanes	Portland Winterhawks
September 22, 2009	conditional 6th Round Draft Pick →	← Radim Valchar
September 22, 2009	LET trades a conditional 6th Round Draft Pick in the 2010 WHL Bantam Draft – POR trades Radim Valchar.	
September 22, 2009	Everett Silvertips	Saskatoon Blades
September 22, 2009	6th Round Draft Pick → 3rd Round Draft Pick →	← Chris Langkow
September 22, 2009	EVT trades 6th Round Draft Pick in the 2010 WHL Bantam Draft and 3rd Round Draft Pick in the 2011 WHL Bantam Draft – SAS trades Chris Langkow.	
September 23, 2009	Spokane Chiefs	Lethbridge Hurricanes
September 23, 2009	Mike Reddington → Landon Oslanski →	← Kyle Beach
September 23, 2009	SPO trades Mike Reddington and Landon Oslanski – LET trades Kyle Beach.	
September 27, 2009	Tri-City Americans	Lethbridge Hurricanes
September 27, 2009	6th Round Draft Pick →	← Cody Castro
September 27, 2009	TRI trades a 6th Round Draft Pick in the 2010 WHL Bantam Draft – LET trades Cody Castro.	
September 27, 2009	Lethbridge Hurricanes	Regina Pats
September 27, 2009	Conditional 5th Round Draft Pick →	← Linden Rowat
September 27, 2009	LET trades a Conditional 5th Round Draft Pick in the 2010 WHL Bantam Draft – REG trades Linden Rowat.	
September 28, 2009	Saskatoon Blades	Seattle Thunderbirds
September 28, 2009	Stefan Burzan → 3rd Round Draft Pick →	← Jeremy Boyer
September 28, 2009	SAS trades a Stefan Burzan and 3rd Round Draft Pick in the 2010 WHL Bantam Draft – SEA trades Jeremy Boyer.	
September 28, 2009	Regina Pats	Portland Winterhawks
September 28, 2009	4th Round Draft Pick → Conditional Draft Pick →	← Killian Hutt
September 28, 2009	REG trades 4th Round Draft Pick in the 2010 WHL Bantam Draft and Conditional Draft Pick in the 2011 WHL Bantam Draft – POR trades Killian Hutt.	
September 28, 2009	Saskatoon Blades	Kelowna Rockets
September 28, 2009	Tyler Matheson →	← Conditional 7th Round Draft Pick
September 28, 2009	SAS trades Tyler Matheson – KEL trades a Conditional 7th Round Draft Pick in the 2010 WHL Bantam Draft.	
September 29, 2009	Red Deer Rebels	Vancouver Giants
September 29, 2009	Cass Mappin →	← Andrej Kudrna
September 29, 2009	RDR trades Cass Mappin – VAN trades Andrej Kudrna.	
September 30, 2009	Medicine Hat Tigers	Moose Jaw Warriors
September 30, 2009	Mike Forsyth → 6th Round Draft Pick →	← Matt MacKay ← Deven Dubyk
September 30, 2009	MH trades Mike Forsyth and a 6th Round Draft Pick in the 2010 WHL Bantam Draft – MJ trades Matt MacKay and Deven Dubyk.	
October 5, 2009	Saskatoon Blades	Prince Albert Raiders
October 5, 2009	Brendon Wall → Tyler Yaworski → 4th Round Draft Pick →	← Steven Stanford ← 6th Round Draft Pick
October 5, 2009	SAS trades Brendon Wall, Tyler Yaworski and a 4th Round Draft Pick in the 2011 WHL Bantam Draft – PA trades Steven Stanford and a 6th Round Draft Pick in the 2011 WHL Bantam Draft.	
October 5, 2009	Brandon Wheat Kings	Prince Albert Raiders
October 5, 2009	Dalyn Flette →	← a Conditional 7th Round Draft Pick
October 5, 2009	BRN trades Dalyn Flette – PA trades a Conditional 7th Round Draft Pick in the 2010 WHL Bantam Draft. If Fleete is on the roster by December 1, 2009, PA will trade a 5th Round Draft Pick in the 2011 WHL Bantam Draft to BRN.	
October 6, 2009	Chilliwack Bruins	Saskatoon Blades
October 6, 2009	Randy McNaught →	← Jamie Crooks
October 6, 2009	CWK trades Randy McNaught – SAS trades Jamie Crooks.	
October 7, 2009	Chilliwack Bruins	Medicine Hat Tigers
October 7, 2009	6th Round Pick →	← Colton Grant
October 7, 2009	CWK trades 6th round pick in the 2010 WHL Bantam Draft – MH trades Colton Grant.	
October 8, 2009	Kamloops Blazers	Medicine Hat Tigers
October 8, 2009	Cole Grbavac →	← John Stampohar
October 8, 2009	KAM trades Cole Grbavac – MH trades John Stampohar.	
October 8, 2009	Chilliwack Bruins	Saskatoon Blades
October 8, 2009	Scott Ramsay →	← 7th Round Draft Pick
October 8, 2009	CWK trades Scott Ramsay – SAS in exchange for 7th Round Draft Pick in the 2010 WHL Bantam Draft.	
October 8, 2009	Saskatoon Blades	Seattle Thunderbirds
October 8, 2009	Scott Ramsay →	← Robbie Newton
October 8, 2009	SAS trades Scott Ramsay – SEA trades Robbie Newton.	
October 9, 2009	Swift Current Broncos	Kelowna Rockets
October 9, 2009	Chad Ketting →	← Conditional 7th Round Draft Pick
October 9, 2009	SC trades Chad Ketting – KEL trades Conditional 7th Round Draft Pick in the 2011 WHL Bantam Draft.	
October 13, 2009	Spokane Chiefs	Lethbridge Hurricanes
October 13, 2009	8th Round Draft Pick →	← Michael Tadjdeh
October 13, 2009	SPO trades 8th Round Draft Pick in the 2011 WHL Bantam Draft – LET trades Michael Tadjdeh.	
October 13, 2009	Vancouver Giants	Saskatoon Blades
October 13, 2009	3rd Round Draft Pick →	← Milan Kytnar
October 13, 2009	VAN trades 3rd Round Draft Pick in the 2010 WHL Bantam Draft – SAS trades Milan Kytner.	
October 15, 2009	Brandon Wheat Kings	Seattle Thunderbirds
October 15, 2009	Brendan Rouse →	← Jacob De Serres
October 15, 2009	BRN trades Brendan Rouse – SEA trades Jacob De Serres.	
October 19, 2009	Regina Pats	Medicine Hat Tigers
October 19, 2009	Mason Logan →	← Cody Carlson
October 19, 2009	REG trades Mason Logan – MH trades Cody Carlson.	
October 21, 2009	Red Deer Rebels	Kelowna Rockets
October 21, 2009	4th Round Draft Pick →	← Aaron Borejko
October 21, 2009	RDR trades 4th Round Draft Pick in 2009 WHL Bantam Draft – KEL trades Aaron Borejko.	
October 22, 2009	Edmonton Oil Kings	Medicine Hat Tigers
October 22, 2009	Austin Bourhis →	← Josh Koper
October 22, 2009	EDM trades Austin Bourhis – MH trades Josh Koper.	
October 28, 2009	Brandon Wheat Kings	Everett Silvertips
October 28, 2009	Conditional Draft Pick →	← Paul Van de Velde
October 28, 2009	BRN trades Conditional Draft Pick in the 2010 WHL Bantam Draft – SAS trades Paul Van de Velde.	
November 3, 2009	Calgary Hitmen	Prince George Cougars
November 3, 2009	Conditional 8th Round Draft Pick →	← Del Cowan
November 3, 2009	CGY trades Conditional 8th Round Draft Pick in the 2011 WHL Bantam Draft – PG trades Del Cowan.	
November 5, 2009	Spokane Chiefs	Lethbridge Hurricanes
November 5, 2009	Dustin Donaghy →	← 6th Round Draft Pick
November 5, 2009	SPO trades Dustin Donaghy – LET trades 6th Round Draft Pick in the 2010 WHL Bantam Draft.	
November 10, 2009	Chilliwack Bruins	Prince Albert Raiders
November 10, 2009	12th Round Draft Pick →	← Cole Penner
November 10, 2009	CWK trades 12th Round Draft Pick in the 2010 WHL Bantam Draft – PA trades Cole Penner.	
November 12, 2009	Chilliwack Bruins	Calgary Hitmen
November 12, 2009	Carter Berg →	← 4th Round Draft Pick
November 12, 2009	CWK trades Carter Berg – CGY trades 4th Round Draft Pick in the 2011 WHL Bantam Draft.	
November 16, 2009	Kelowna Rockets	Swift Current Broncos
November 16, 2009	Stepan Novotny → Tanner Clark →	← Geordie Wudrick
November 16, 2009	KEL trades Stepan Novotny and Tanner Clark – SC trades Geordie Wudrick.	
November 18, 2009	Edmonton Oil Kings	Tri-City Americans
November 18, 2009	4th Round Draft Pick →	← Lane Werbowski
November 18, 2009	EDM trades 4th Round Draft Pick in the 2011 WHL Bantam Draft – TRI trades Lane Werbowski.	
November 19, 2009	Lethbridge Hurricanes	Tri-City Americans
November 19, 2009	Eric Mestery →	← 2nd Round Draft Pick
November 19, 2009	LET trades Eric Mestery – TRI trades 2nd Round Draft Pick in the 2010 WHL Bantam Draft.	
November 21, 2009	Red Deer Rebels	Vancouver Giants
November 21, 2009	Connor Redmond →	← Lane Scheidl
November 21, 2009	RDR trades Connor Redmond – VAN trades Lane Scheidl.	
November 22, 2009	Portland Winterhawks	Kamloops Blazers
November 22, 2009	Kurtis Mucha →	← 4th Round Draft Pick
November 22, 2009	POR trades Kurtis Mucha – KAM trades 4th Round Draft Pick in the 2010 WHL Bantam Draft.	
November 23, 2009	Kamloops Blazers	Calgary Hitmen
November 23, 2009	Giffen Nyren →	← Conditional 6th Round Draft Pick
November 23, 2009	KAM trades Giffen Nyren – CGY trades Conditional 6th Round Draft Pick in the 2010 WHL Bantam Draft.	
November 23, 2009	Kamloops Blazers	Vancouver Giants
November 23, 2009	Brett Lyon →	← Ryan Funk
November 23, 2009	KAM trades Brett Lyon – VAN trades Ryan Funk.	
November 23, 2009	Tri-City Americans	Prince George Cougars
November 23, 2009	Spencer Asuchak →	← 13th Round Draft Pick
November 23, 2009	TRI trades Spencer Asuchak – PG trades 13th Round Draft Pick in the 2010 WHL Bantam Draft.	
November 24, 2009	Tri-City Americans	Vancouver Giants
November 24, 2009	13th Round Draft Pick →	← Todd Kennedy
November 24, 2009	TRI trades 13th Round Draft Pick in the 2010 WHL Bantam Draft – VAN trades Todd Kennedy.	
November 24, 2009	Prince Albert Raiders	Portland Winterhawks
November 24, 2009	4th Round Draft Pick →	← Colin Reddin
November 24, 2009	PA trades 4th Round Draft Pick in the 2011 WHL Bantam Draft – POR trades Colin Reddin.	
November 26, 2009	Portland Winterhawks	Swift Current Broncos
November 26, 2009	Travis Bobbee →	← Eric Doyle
November 26, 2009	POR trades Travis Bobbee – SC trades Eric Doyle.	
December 1, 2009	Chilliwack Bruins	Swift Current Broncos
December 1, 2009	Mark Friesen →	← 3rd Round Draft Pick
December 1, 2009	CWK trades Mark Friesen – SC trades 3rd Round Draft Pick in the 2010 WHL Bantam Draft.	
December 2, 2009	Calgary Hitmen	Seattle Thunderbirds
December 2, 2009	Erik Bonsor →	← 6th Round Draft Pick
December 2, 2009	CGY trades Erik Bonsor – SEA trades 6th Round Draft Pick in the 2010 WHL Bantam Draft.	
December 7, 2009	Kootenay Ice	Lethbridge Hurricanes
December 7, 2009	Cason Machacek →	← 4th Round Draft Pick
December 7, 2009	KTN trades Cason Machacek – LET trades 4th Round Pick in the 2011 WHL Bantam Draft.	
December 9, 2009	Regina Pats	Lethbridge Hurricanes
December 9, 2009	Graham Hood → Taylor Balog → 2nd Round Draft Pick → 1st Round Draft Pick →	← Carter Ashton ← Craig Orfino ← 3rd Round Draft Pick
December 9, 2009	REG trades Graham Hood, Taylor Balog, 2nd Round Draft Pick in the 2010 WHL Bantam Draft, and 1st Round Draft Pick in the 2011 WHL Bantam Draft – LET trades Carter Ashton, Craig Orfino, and 3rd Round Pick in the 2010 WHL Bantam Draft.	
December 10, 2009	Regina Pats	Vancouver Giants
December 10, 2009	Derek Tendler → 5th Round Draft Pick → 1st Round Draft Pick (CHL Import Draft) →	← Cass Mappin ← Mitch Spooner ← Mikael Jung
December 10, 2009	REG trades Derek Tendler, 5th Round Draft Pick in the 2011 WHL Bantam Draft, and 1st Round Draft Pick in the 2010 CHL Import Draft – VAN trades Cass Mappin, Mitch Spooner, and Mikael Jung.	
December 12, 2009	Everett Silvertips	Kamloops Blazers
December 12, 2009	5th Round Draft Pick →	← Curtis Kulchar
December 12, 2009	EVT trades 5th Round Draft Pick in the 2011 WHL Bantam Draft – KAM trades Curtis Kulchar.	
December 13, 2009	Brandon Wheat Kings	Kamloops Blazers
December 13, 2009	Jordan DePape →	← Shayne Wiebe
December 13, 2009	BRN trades Jordan DePape – KAM trades Shayne Wiebe.	
December 14, 2009	Red Deer Rebels	Seattle Thunderbirds
December 14, 2009	Conditional 7th Round Draft Pick →	← Brad Haber
December 14, 2009	RDR trades Conditional 7th Round Draft Pick in the 2010 WHL Bantam Draft – SEA trades Brad Haber.	
December 28, 2009	Edmonton Oil Kings	Everett Silvertips
December 28, 2009	Clayton Cumiskey →	← Cameron Abney
December 28, 2009	EDM trades Clayton Cumisky – EVT trades Cameron Abney.	
December 28, 2009	Chilliwack Bruins	Prince Albert Raiders
December 28, 2009	13th Round Draft Pick →	← Brendan Persley
December 28, 2009	CWK trades 13th Round Draft Pick in the 2010 WHL Bantam Draft – PA trades Brendan Persley.	
December 30, 2009	Edmonton Oil Kings	Brandon Wheat Kings
December 30, 2009	Brent Raedeke →	← Klarc Wilson ← Conditional 3rd Round Draft Pick
December 30, 2009	EDM trades Brent Raedeke – BRN trades Klarc Wilson and Conditional 3rd Round Draft Pick in the 2011 WHL Bantam Draft.	
December 30, 2009	Tri-City Americans	Regina Pats
December 30, 2009	Brett Martyniuk →	← Conditional 13th Round Draft Pick
December 30, 2009	TRI trades Brett Martyniuk – REG trades Conditional 13th Round Draft Pick in the 2010 WHL Bantam Draft.	
January 6, 2010	Vancouver Giants	Prince Albert Raiders
January 6, 2010	Jamie Tucker →	← 2nd Round Draft Pick
January 6, 2010	VAN trades Jamie Tucker – PA trades 2nd Round Draft Pick in the 2011 WHL Bantam Draft.	
January 6, 2010	Seattle Thunderbirds	Prince Albert Raiders
January 6, 2010	Jonathan Parker → 5th Round Draft Pick →	← Ryan Aasman
January 6, 2010	SEA trades Jonathan Parker and 5th Round Draft Pick in the 2010 WHL Bantam Draft – PA trades Ryan Aasman.	
January 7, 2010	Everett Silvertips	Lethbridge Hurricanes
January 7, 2010	Drew McDermott →	← Conditional 7th Round Draft Pick
January 7, 2010	EVT trades Drew McDermott – LET trades a Conditional 7th Round Draft Pick in the 2011 WHL Bantam Draft.	
January 8, 2010	Seattle Thunderbirds	Saskatoon Blades
January 8, 2010	Sena Acolatse →	← Burke Gallimore
January 8, 2010	SEA trades Sena Acolaste – SAS trades Burke Gallimore.	
January 10, 2010	Edmonton Oil Kings	Vancouver Giants
January 10, 2010	Brett Breitkreuz → Tomas Vincour →	← Gary Nunn ← Mike Piluso ← Sebastian Svendsen ← 5th Round Draft Pick ← 3rd Round Draft Pick ← Conditional 3rd Round Draft Pick
January 10, 2010	EDM trades Brett Breitkreuz and Tomas Vincour – VAN trades Gary Nunn, Mike Piluso, Sebastian Svendsen, 5th Round Draft Pick in the 2010 WHL Bantam Draft, 3rd Round Draft Pick in the 2011 WHL Bantam Draft, and a Conditional 3rd Round Draft Pick in the 2012 WHL Bantam Draft.	
January 10, 2010	Seattle Thunderbirds	Prince George Cougars
January 10, 2010	Kyle Jahraus →	← Robbie Ciolfi
January 10, 2010	SEA trades Kyle Jahraus – PG trades Robbie Ciolfi.	
January 10, 2010	Brandon Wheat Kings	Moose Jaw Warriors
January 10, 2010	Dallas Ehrhardt → 2nd Round Draft Pick → 2nd Round Draft Pick →	← Travis Hamonic
January 10, 2010	BRN trades Dallas Ehrhardt, 2nd Round Draft Pick in the 2010 WHL Bantam Draft and 2nd Round Draft Pick in the 2011 WHL Bantam Draft – MJ trades Travis Hamonic.	
January 10, 2010	Lethbridge Hurricanes	Vancouver Giants
January 10, 2010	Brent Henke →	← 5th Round Draft Pick
January 10, 2010	LET trades Brent Henke – VAN trades 5th Round Draft Pick in the 2011 WHL Bantam Draft.	
January 10, 2010	Portland Winterhawks	Lethbridge Hurricanes
January 10, 2010	Daniel Johnston → Jacob Berglund → 1st Round Draft Pick →	← Luca Sbisa ← 1st Round Draft Pick ← 5th Round Draft Pick
January 10, 2010	POR trades Daniel Johnston, Jacob Berglund, and 1st Round Draft Pick in the 2010 CHL Import Draft – LET trades Luca Sbisa, 1st Round Draft Pick in the 2010 CHL Draft, and 5th Round Draft Pick in the 2011 WHL Bantam Draft.	
January 10, 2010	Regina Pats	Chilliwack Bruins
January 10, 2010	Matt Delahey →	← Mitch McColm
January 10, 2010	REG trades Matt Delahey – CWK trades Mitch McColm.	
January 10, 2010	Kootenay Ice	Prince George Cougars
January 10, 2010	Petr Senkerik →	← 5th Round Draft Pick
January 10, 2010	KTN trades Petr Senkerik – PG trades 5th Round Draft Pick in the 2011 WHL Bantam Draft.	
January 10, 2010	Saskatoon Blades	Prince George Cougars
January 10, 2010	Tyler Santos → 3rd Round Draft Pick → Conditional 3rd Round Draft Pick →	← Marek Viedensky
January 10, 2010	SAS trades Tyler Santos, 3rd Round Draft Pick in the 2010 WHL Bantam Draft, and a Conditional Draft Pick in the 2011 WHL Bantam Draft – PG trades Marek Viedensky.	
January 10, 2010	Prince Albert Raiders	Kelowna Rockets
January 10, 2010	Sean Aschim →	← 6th Round Draft Pick
January 10, 2010	PA trades Sean Aschim – KEL trades 6th Round Draft Pick in the 2010 WHL Bantam Draft.	
January 10, 2010	Saskatoon Blades	Kelowna Rockets
January 10, 2010	Colton Scissons → 3rd Round Draft Pick →	← Curt Gogol
January 10, 2010	SAS trades Colton Scissons and 3rd Round Draft Pick in the 2011 WHL Bantam Draft – KEL trades Curt Gogol.	
January 10, 2010	Prince George Cougars	Kelowna Rockets
January 10, 2010	Dallas Jackson →	← Tyler Halliday ← 3rd Round Draft Pick
January 10, 2010	PG trades Dallas Jackson – KEL trades Tyler Halliday and 3rd Round Draft Pick in the 2011 WHL Bantam Draft.	
January 10, 2010	Swift Current Broncos	Kelowna Rockets
January 10, 2010	5th Round Draft Pick →	← Kyle Verdino
January 10, 2010	SC trades 5th Round Draft Pick in the 2011 WHL Bantam Draft – KEL trades Kyle Verdino.	
January 10, 2010	Seattle Thunderbirds	Prince Albert Raiders
January 10, 2010	Stefan Warg →	← Austin Frank ← 5th Round Draft Pick
January 10, 2010	SEA trades Stefan Warg – PA trades Austin Frank and 5th Round Draft Pick in the 2010 WHL Bantam Draft.	
January 10, 2010	Calgary Hitmen	Kamloops Blazers
January 10, 2010	Chase Schaber → Austin Madaisky → Conditional 3rd Round Draft Pick →	← Tyler Shattock ← Jimmy Bubnick ← Zak Stebner ← Conditional 4th Round Draft Pick
January 10, 2010	CGY trades Chase Schaber, Austin Madaisky and Conditional 3rd Round Draft Pick in the 2011 WHL Bantam Draft – KAM trades Tyler Shattock, Jimmy Bubnick, Zak Stebnar and Conditional 4th Round Draft Pick in the 2011 WHL Bantam Draft.	
January 10, 2010	Swift Current Broncos	Tri-City Americans
January 10, 2010	Mike Brown →	← 5th Round Draft Pick
January 10, 2010	SC trades Mike Brown – TRI trades 5th Round Draft Pick in the 2011 WHL Bantam Draft.	

== Subway Super Series ==
The Subway Super Series (formerly known as ADT Canada Russia Challenge) was a six-game series featuring four teams: three from the Canadian Hockey League (CHL)—one team from each of the QMJHL, the OHL, and the WHL—versus Russia's national junior hockey team.

The 2009 series was held in six cities across Canada. The series began on November 16, 2009, and concluded on November 26, 2009. Both Western Hockey League games were held in British Columbia. Former Victoria Cougar goaltender and Hall of Famer, Grant Fuhr, was named Honorary Captain for the first game in the series, held in Victoria on November 25, 2009. The next night, retired Kelowna fire chief, Gerry Zimmermann, was named Honorary Captain for the final game of the series.

=== Results ===
In the first game of the two part series between Team WHL and Team Russia, Team WHL scored two goals en route to a 2–1 win in front of 6,695 fans at Save-On-Foods Memorial Centre in Victoria. Goaltender Igor Bobkov of Team Russia and forward Levko Koper of Team WHL were named Players of the Game for their respective teams. The next night at Prospera Place in Kelowna, Team WHL defeated Team Russia 4–2 to end the series and give the CHL a 6–0 record. Goaltender Igor Bobkov was named Team Russia's Player of the Game for the second straight night, while Brandon McMillan was named Team WHL's Player of the Game.

Date	Location	Winner	Loser
November 16	Drummondville, Quebec	QMJHL all-stars 3	1 Team Russia
November 18	Shawinigan, Quebec	QMJHL all-stars 8	3 Team Russia
November 19	Barrie, Ontario	OHL all-stars 5	2 Team Russia
November 23	Windsor, Ontario	OHL all-stars 5	2 Team Russia
November 25	Victoria, British Columbia	WHL all-stars 2	1 Team Russia
November 26	Kelowna, British Columbia	WHL all-stars 4	2 Team Russia
CHL wins series 6–0

== 2010 WHL Playoffs ==
=== Overview ===
Conference Quarterfinals	Conference Semifinals
1	Calgary	4
8	Moose Jaw	3
1	Calgary	4
5	Medicine Hat	2
2	Brandon	4
7	Swift Current	0
Eastern
3	Saskatoon	4
6	Red Deer	0
2	Brandon	4
3	Saskatoon	2
4	Kootenay	2
5	Medicine Hat	4
Note: Pairings are re-seeded after the first round.
1	Tri-City	4
8	Chilliwack	2
1	Tri-City	4
6	Kelowna	1
2	Vancouver	4
7	Kamloops	0
Western
3	Everett	3
6	Kelowna	4
2	Vancouver	4
5	Portland	2
4	Spokane	3
5	Portland	4

Conference Finals
1	Calgary	4
2	Brandon	1
1	Tri-City	4
2	Vancouver	2

WHL Championship
E1	Calgary	4
W1	Tri-City	1

== Conference Quarter-finals ==
=== Eastern Conference ===
==== (1) Calgary Hitmen vs. (8) Moose Jaw Warriors ====
March 18	Calgary Hitmen	2 – 4	Moose Jaw Warriors	Pengrowth Saddledome	Recap
13:52 - Matt MacKenzie (1)		First period	Jason Bast (1) - 10:54; Antonin Honejsek (1) - pp - 13:18
No scoring		Second period	Thomas Frazee (1) - pp - 6:44; Chad Suer (1) - pp - 12:20
12:06 - pp - Brandon Kozun (1)		Third period	No scoring
Martin Jones (12 saves / 16 shots)		Goalie stats	Jeff Bosch (48 saves / 50 shots)

March 20	Calgary Hitmen	1 – 4	Moose Jaw Warriors	Pengrowth Saddledome	Recap
No scoring		First period	Antonín Honejsek (2) - 16:40; Jason Bast (2) - 17:25; Dylan Hood (1) - 19:32
No scoring		Second period	No scoring
1:07 - Kris Foucault (1)		Third period	Jason Bast (3) - 0:08
Martin Jones (25 saves / 29 shots)		Goalie stats	Jeff Bosch (30 saves / 31 shots)

March 22	Moose Jaw Warriors	3 – 7	Calgary Hitmen	Moose Jaw Civic Centre	Recap
No scoring		First period	Cody Sylvester (1) - 1:42; Ian Schultz (1) - 19:08
7:43 - Thomas Frazee (2); 19:07 - Jason Bast (4)		Second period	Zak Stebner (1) - 8:10; Mikhail Fisenko (1) - 17:11
0:56 - pp - Jason Bast (5)		Third period	Joel Broda (1) - 4:24; Cody Sylvester (2) - 5:20; Ian Schultz (2) - pp - 8:39
Jeff Bosch (24 saves / 30 shots); Brandon Glover (7 saves / 8 shots)		Goalie stats	Martin Jones (31 saves / 34 shots)

March 23	Moose Jaw Warriors	4 – 3	Calgary Hitmen	Moose Jaw Civic Centre	Recap
3:39 - Jason Bast (6); 7:38 - pp - Chad Suer (2); 17:33 - Thomas Frazee (3)		First period	Joel Broda (2) - pp - 11:28
8:05 - Nathan MacMaster (1)		Second period	Cody Sylvester (3) - 9:15
No scoring		Third period	Giffen Nyren (1) - 8:01
Jeff Bosch (35 saves / 38 shots)		Goalie stats	Martin Jones (33 saves / 37 shots)

March 25	Calgary Hitmen	5 – 2	Moose Jaw Warriors	Pengrowth Saddledome	Recap
No scoring		First period	Antonin Honejsek (3) - pp - 18:59
6:32 - Mikhail Fisenko (2); 7:47 - pp - Brandon Kozun (2); 13:32 - sh - Tyler Fiddler (1); 17:00 - pp - Michael Stone (1)		Second period
12:13 - pp - Ian Schultz (3)		Third period	Antonin Honejsek (4) - 13:53
Martin Jones (22 saves / 24 shots); Mike Snider (0 saves / 0 shots)		Goalie stats	Jeff Bosch (23 saves / 28 shots); Brandon Glover (2 saves / 2 shots)

March 27	Moose Jaw Warriors	3 – 7	Calgary Hitmen	Moose Jaw Civic Centre	Recap
No scoring		First period	Tyler Shattock (1) - 12:49; Del Cowan (1) - 18:09
4:54 - pp - Thomas Frazee (4); 16:01 - pp - Chad Suer (3); 17:24 - Connor Cox (1)		Second period	Joel Broda (3) - 1:40; Giffen Nyren (2) - 11:52
No scoring		Third period	Del Cowan (2) - pp - 1:12; Ian Schultz (4) - pp - 12:03; Ian Schultz (5) - 16:42
Jeff Bosch (36 saves / 43 shots)		Goalie stats	Martin Jones (36 saves / 39 shots)

March 29	Calgary Hitmen	6 – 2	Moose Jaw Warriors	Pengrowth Saddledome	Recap
3:56 - Cody Sylvester (4); 12:11 - Jimmy Bubnick (1); 14:42 - pp - Tyler Shattock (2)		First period	Jason Bast (7) - pp - 10:17
16:36 - pp - Brandon Kozun (3); 19:46 - Jimmy Bubnick (2)		Second period	No scoring
12:24 - Cody Sylvester (5)		Third period	Dylan Hood (2) - 7:33
Martin Jones (25 saves / 27 shots)		Goalie stats	Jeff Bosch (28 saves / 34 shots)

Calgary won series 4 – 3

==== (2) Brandon Wheat Kings vs. (7) Swift Current Broncos ====
March 19	Brandon Wheat Kings	5 – 2	Swift Current Broncos	Westman Place	Recap
15:39 - Matt Calvert (1)		First period	Taylor Vause (1) - pp - 9:21
6:29 - pp - Scott Glennie (1); 8:04 - Matt Calvert (2)		Second period	No scoring
7:41 - sh - Brent Raedeke (1); 19:56 - en - Brayden Schenn (1)		Third period	Taylor Vause (2) - 17:43
Jacob DeSerres (28 saves / 30 shots)		Goalie stats	Morgan Clark (23 saves / 27 shots)

March 20	Brandon Wheat Kings	5 – 3	Swift Current Broncos	Westman Place	Recap
No scoring		First period	No scoring
9:59 - pp - Brayden Schenn (2)		Second period	No scoring
4:32 - pp - Aaron Lewadniuk (1); 7:22 - pp - Travis Hamonic (1); 14:54 - Jay Fehr (1); 18:55 - Aaron Lewadniuk (2)		Third period	Cody Eakin (1) - sh - 3:55; Justin Dowling (1) - 8:41; Štěpán Novotný (1) - 10:24
Jacob DeSerres (20 saves / 23 shots)		Goalie stats	Mark Friesen (36 saves / 41 shots)

March 23	Swift Current Broncos	2 – 5	Brandon Wheat Kings	Brandt Centre	Recap
No scoring		First period	Brayden Schenn - sh - 1:33; Aaron Lewadniuk (3) - 4:01
5:13 - Brad Hoban (1); 9:27 - Justin Dowling (2)		Second period	No scoring
No scoring		Third period	Alexander Urbom (1) - 8:49; Brayden Schenn (4) - 10:29; Matt Calvert (3) - en - 18:24
Morgan Clark (28 saves / 32 shots)		Goalie stats	Jacob DeSerres (35 saves / 37 shots)

March 24	Swift Current Broncos	2 – 3	OT	Brandon Wheat Kings	Brandt Centre	Recap
No scoring		First period		No scoring
13:15 - Andy Blanke (1); 18:41 - sh - Taylor Vause (3)		Second period		Travis Hamonic (2) - 4:39; Brayden Schenn (5) - pp - 7:51
No scoring		Third period		No scoring
No scoring		First overtime period		Alexander Urbom (2) - 16:27
Mark Friesen (45 saves / 48 shots)		Goalie stats		Jacob DeSerres (20 saves / 22 shots)

Brandon won series 4 – 0

- Note: Games 3 and 4 were played at the Brandt Centre in Regina because of the 2010 World Women's Curling Championship was held at Credit Union iPlex in Swift Current.

==== (3) Saskatoon Blades vs. (6) Red Deer Rebels ====
March 20	Saskatoon Blades	3 – 0	Red Deer Rebels	Credit Union Centre	Recap
14:20 - Curt Gogol (1); 16:42 - pp - Gaelan Patterson (1); 17:54 - Gaelan Patterson (2)		First period	No scoring
No scoring		Second period	No scoring
No scoring		Third period	No scoring
Steven Stanford (24 saves / 24 shots)		Goalie stats	Darcy Kuemper (24 saves / 27 shots)

March 21	Saskatoon Blades	4 – 0	Red Deer Rebels	Credit Union Centre	Recap
1:53 - Curtis Hamilton (1); 2:55 - Jyri Niemi (1); 4:36 - Walker Wintoneak (1)		First period	No scoring
No scoring		Second period	No scoring
10:29 - Darian Dziurzynski (1)		Third period	No scoring
Steven Stanford (33 saves / 33 shots)		Goalie stats	Darcy Kuemper (1 save / 4 shots); Kraymer Barnstable (17 saves / 18 shots)

March 24	Red Deer Rebels	1 – 2	OT	Saskatoon Blades	Enmax Centrium	Recap
No scoring		First period		No scoring
10:52 - Willie Coetzee (1)		Second period		Stefan Elliott (1) - pp - 9:04
No scoring		Third period		No scoring
No scoring		First overtime period		Marek Viedenský (1) - 5:03
Kraymer Barnstable (39 saves / 41 shots)		Goalie stats		Steven Stanford (37 saves / 38 shots)

March 25	Red Deer Rebels	2 – 5	Saskatoon Blades	Enmax Centrium	Recap
No scoring		First period	No scoring
1:47 - sh - Adam Kambeitz (1)		Second period	Stefan Elliott (2) - pp - 8:06; Jeremy Boyer (1) - 13:11
16:22 - pp - Brett Ferguson (1)		Third period	Curtis Hamilton (2) - 4:23; Marek Viedenský (2) - 8:15; Gaelan Patterson (3) - en - 18:42
Kraymer Barnstable (24 saves / 27 shots)		Goalie stats	Steven Stanford (31 saves / 33 shots)

Saskatoon won series 4 – 0

==== (4) Kootenay Ice vs. (5) Medicine Hat Tigers ====
March 19	Kootenay Ice	6 – 2	Medicine Hat Tigers	Cranbrook Recreational Complex	Recap
9:17 - Kevin King (1); 19:29 - Matt Fraser (1)		First period	Emerson Etem (1) - 5:56; Matt MacKay (1) - 17:07
11:41 - pp - Hayden Rintoul (1); 15:55 - Brock Montgomery (1)		Second period	No scoring
1:37 - Dustin Sylvester (1); 16:16 - sh - en - Joey Leach (1)		Third period	No scoring
Todd Mathews (25 saves / 27 shots)		Goalie stats	Tyler Bunz (20 saves / 24 shots); Deven Dubyk (7 saves / 8 shots)

March 20	Kootenay Ice	4 – 0	Medicine Hat Tigers	Cranbrook Recreational Complex	Recap
9:50 - pp - Kevin King (2)		First period	No scoring
7:35 - Max Reinhart (1); 11:36 - pp - Kevin King (3)		Second period	No scoring
4:56 - Elgin Pearce (1)		Third period	No scoring
Todd Mathews (20 saves / 20 shots)		Goalie stats	Tyler Bunz (25 saves / 29 shots)

March 23	Medicine Hat Tigers	4 – 1	Kootenay Ice	Medicine Hat Arena	Recap
4:40 - Emerson Etem (2)		First period	James Martin (1) - 19:43
No scoring		Second period	No scoring
18:34 - Wacey Hamilton (1); 19:28 - sh - en - Joey Frazer (1)		Third period	No scoring
Tyler Bunz (20 saves / 21 shots)		Goalie stats	Todd Mathews (23 saves / 26 shots)

March 24	Medicine Hat Tigers	5 – 1	Kootenay Ice	Medicine Hat Arena	Recap
9:52 - Emerson Etem (3)		First period	No scoring
2:08 - sh - ps - Taylor Gal (1); 7:19 - pp - Tomáš Kundrátek; 8:14 - Mark Isherwood (1); 13:59 - pp - Wacey Hamilton (2)		Second period	Dominik Pacovský (1) - 4:19
No scoring		Third period	No scoring
Tyler Bunz (21 saves / 22 shots)		Goalie stats	Todd Mathews (20 saves / 25 shots); Nathan Lieuwen (6 saves / 6 shots)

March 26	Kootenay Ice	2 – 5	Medicine Hat Tigers	Cranbrook Recreational Complex	Recap
1:22 - Kevin King (4)		First period	Matt Konan (1) - 4:09; Jace Coyle (2) - 6:35; Kale Kessy (1) - 19:52
4:32 - pp - Dominik Pacovský (2)		Second period	No scoring
No scoring		Third period	Linden Vey (1) - 14:09; Bretton Cameron (1) - en - 17:52
Todd Mathews (11 saves / 14 shots); Nathan Lieuwen (7 saves / 8 shots)		Goalie stats	Tyler Bunz (31 saves / 33 shots)

March 28	Medicine Hat Tigers	4 – 1	Kootenay Ice	Medicine Hat Arena	Recap
12:37 - Emerson Etem (4)		First period	No scoring
1:36 - Joey Frazer (2); 11:12 - Tristan King (1)		Second period	No scoring
18:39 - en - Joey Frazer (3)		Third period	Drew Czerwonka (1) - 3:01
Tyler Bunz (23 saves / 24 shots)		Goalie stats	Nathan Lieuwen (20 saves / 23 shots)

Medicine Hat won series 4 – 2

=== Western Conference ===
==== (1) Tri-City Americans vs. (8) Chilliwack Bruins ====
March 19	Tri-City Americans	4 – 2	Chilliwack Bruins	Toyota Center	Recap
No scoring		First period	Dylen McKinlay (1) - pp - 11:45
No scoring		Second period	No scoring
3:41 - Kruise Reddick (1); 4:18 - Johnny Lazo (1); 5:07 - Neal Prokop (1); 7:44 - Sergei Drozd (1)		Third period	Ryan Howse (1) - pp - 13:55
Drew Owsley (33 saves / 35 shots)		Goalie stats	Lucas Gore (33 saves / 37 shots)

March 20	Tri-City Americans	8 – 1	Chilliwack Bruins	Toyota Center	Recap
1:25 - pp - Brendan Shinnimin (1)		First period	No scoring
7:01 - Jordan Messier (1); 7:32 - Kruise Reddick (2); 11:50 - pp - Brendan Shinnimin (2)		Second period	No scoring
3:34 - pp - Brendan Shinnimin (3); 10:35 - pp - Todd Kennedy (1); 11:55 - pp - Todd Kennedy (2); 13:14 - pp - Eric Mestery (1)		Third period	Roman Horák (1) - ps - 14:42
Drew Owsley (28 saves / 28 shots); Alexander Pechursky (7 saves / 8 shots)		Goalie stats	Lucas Gore (18 saves / 22 shots); Braden Gamble (6 saves / 10 shots)

March 23	Chilliwack Bruins	5 – 1	Tri-City Americans	Prospera Centre	Recap
6:10 - pp - Kevin Sundher (1); 18:43 - pp - Ryan Howse (2)		First period	No scoring
0:58 - Dylen McKinlay (2); 8:00 - Jamie Crooks (1)		Second period	No scoring
8:08 - Ryan Howse (3)		Third period	Brendan Shinnimin (4) - pp - 11:27
Lucas Gore (48 saves / 49 shots)		Goalie stats	Drew Owsley (9 saves / 13 shots); Alexander Pechursky (16 saves / 17 shots)

March 24	Chilliwack Bruins	3 – 4	OT	Tri-City Americans	Prospera Centre	Recap
No scoring		First period		Patrick Holland (1) - 8:35; Brendan Shinnimin (5) - 9:09
No scoring		Second period		No scoring
3:12 - Ryan Howse (4); 19:38 - Jamie Crooks (2); 19:49 - Kevin Sundher (2)		Third period		Brooks Macek (1) - pp - 10:55
No scoring		First overtime period		Kruise Reddick (3) - 15:09
Lucas Gore (33 saves / 37 shots)		Goalie stats		Drew Owsley (33 saves / 36 shots)

March 26	Tri-City Americans	3 – 4	OT	Chilliwack Bruins	Toyota Center	Recap
6:08 - Brooks Macek (2); 17:10 - Brooks Macek (3)		First period		Alexander Viklund (1) - 16:06
12:38 - pp - Kruise Reddick (4)		Second period		No scoring
No scoring		Third period		Alexander Viklund (2) - pp - 2:30; Ryan Howse (5) - 18:26
No scoring		First overtime period		Kevin Sundher (3) - 7:16
Drew Owsley (30 saves / 34 shots)		Goalie stats		Lucas Gore (44 saves / 47 shots)

March 28	Chilliwack Bruins	1 – 4	Tri-City Americans	Prospera Centre	Recap
No scoring		First period	Patrick Holland (2) - 10:56
8:27 - pp - Roman Horák (2)		Second period	Jordan Messier (2) - 12:55
No scoring		Third period	Sergei Drozd (2) - 1:31; Brooks Macek (4) - pp - 16:35
Lucas Gore (32 saves / 36 shots)		Goalie stats	Drew Owsley (33 saves / 34 shots)

Tri-City won series 4 – 2

==== (2) Vancouver Giants vs. (7) Kamloops Blazers ====
March 19	Vancouver Giants	4 – 3	OT	Kamloops Blazers	Pacific Coliseum	Recap
2:54 - sh - Craig Cunningham (1); 17:52 - Tomáš Vincour (1)		First period		Austin Madaisky (1) - pp - 3:26; Brendan Ranford (1) - 4:04; Ryan Hanes (1) - 9:34
No scoring		Second period		No scoring
14:48 - Craig Cunningham (2)		Third period		No scoring
0:33 - James Henry (1)		First overtime period		No scoring
Mark Segal (11 saves / 14 shots)		Goalie stats		Kurtis Mucha (33 saves / 37 shots)

March 20	Vancouver Giants	6 – 3	Kamloops Blazers	Pacific Coliseum	Recap
3:53 - Craig Cunningham (3)		First period	Brendan Ranford (2) - 3:37
17:34 - pp - Brendan Gallagher (1); 19:28 - pp - Kevin Connauton (1)		Second period	C. J. Stretch (1) - pp - 15:40
2:51 - pp - Kevin Connauton (2); 3:58 - Craig Cunningham (4); 4:14 - James Henry (2)		Third period	Dalibor Bortňák (1) - 4:21
Mark Segal (21 saves / 24 shots)		Goalie stats	Kurtis Mucha (23 saves / 28 shots); Jon Groenheyde (7 saves / 8 shots)

March 23	Kamloops Blazers	4 – 5	OT	Vancouver Giants	Interior Savings Centre	Recap
9:46 - pp - Austin Madaisky (2)		First period		Lance Bouma (1) - pp - 16:35
6:39 - Jake Trask (1); 13:30 - pp - Bronson Maschmeyer (1)		Second period		Brett Breitkreuz (1) - 9:08; Nolan Toigo (1) - sh - 14:03
6:35 - pp - C. J. Stretch (2)		Third period		Brendan Gallagher (2) - 9:24
No scoring		First overtime period		Brett Breitkreuz (2) - 2:28
Kurtis Mucha (34 saves / 39 shots)		Goalie stats		Mark Segal (27 saves / 31 shots)

March 24	Kamloops Blazers	4 – 5	Vancouver Giants	Interior Savings Centre	Recap
15:58 - pp - Colin Smith (1)		First period	No scoring
6:52 - pp - Jake Trask (2); 15:35 - pp - Austin Madaisky (3)		Second period	Milan Kytnár (1) - 3:51; Brendan Gallagher (3) - pp - 10:33; James Henry (3) - 14:19
9:23 - Colin Smith (2)		Third period	Craig Cunningham (5) - 10:45; Brendan Gallagher (4) - 15:41
Jon Groenheyde (26 saves / 31 shots)		Goalie stats	Mark Segal (25 saves / 29 shots)

Vancouver won series 4 – 0

==== (3) Everett Silvertips vs. (6) Kelowna Rockets ====
March 19	Everett Silvertips	5 – 4	OT	Kelowna Rockets	Comcast Arena	Recap
16:54 - pp - Byron Froese (1)		First period		No scoring
4:40 - pp - Zack Dailey (1)		Second period		Antoine Corbin (1) - 12:39; Geordie Wudrick (1) - 18:22
5:02 - Kellan Tochkin (1); 15:34 - Curtis Kulchar (1)		Third period		Brett Bulmer (1) - pp - 8:42; Collin Bowman (1) - 9:12
5:18 - Daniel Iwanski (1)		First overtime period		No scoring
Thomas Heemskerk (30 saves / 34 shots)		Goalie stats		Adam Brown (46 saves / 51 shots)

March 20	Everett Silvertips	5 – 2	Kelowna Rockets	Comcast Arena	Recap
14:20 - pp - Shane Harper (1)		First period	No scoring
10:58 - Markus McCrea (1); 13:19 - Shane Harper (2)		Second period	Geordie Wudrick (2) - 2:41
4:38 - Chris Langkow (1); 13:33 - pp - Ryan Murray (1)		Third period	Geordie Wudrick (3) - 19:12
Kent Simpson (24 saves / 26 shots)		Goalie stats	Adam Brown (26 saves / 31 shots)

March 23	Kelowna Rockets	5 – 3	Everett Silvertips	Prospera Place	Recap
3:07 - pp - Geordie Wudrick (4)		First period	Scott MacDonald (1) - 0:42; Shane Harper (3) - 11:28; Byron Froese (2) - pp - 19:26
3:33 - pp - Geordie Wudrick (5); 10:14 - Mitch Callahan (1)		Second period	No scoring
16:00 - Brett Bulmer (2); 19:40 - en - Mitch Callahan (2)		Third period	No scoring
Adam Brown (7 saves / 9 shots); Mark Guggenberger (22 saves / 23 shots)		Goalie stats	Kent Simpson (33 saves / 37 shots)

March 24	Kelowna Rockets	5 – 4	2OT	Everett Silvertips	Prospera Place	Recap
6:27 - Spencer Main (1); 15:53 - pp - Geordie Wudrick (6); 19:06 - Brett Bulmer (3)		First period		Shane Harper (4) - 1:58; Markus McCrea (2) - 5:53
No scoring		Second period		Clayton Cumiskey (1) - 5:39; Ryan Murray (2) - pp - 8:20
2:45 - Antoine Corbin (2)		Third period		No scoring
0:46 - pp - Geordie Wudrick (7)		Second overtime period		No scoring
Mark Guggenberger (39 saves / 43 shots)		Goalie stats		Thomas Heemskerk (30 saves / 35 shots)

March 26	Everett Silvertips	4 – 0	Kelowna Rockets	Comcast Arena	Recap
1:00 - Tyler Maxwell (1)		First period	No scoring
2:01 - Daniel Iwanski (2); 11:00 - sh - Tyler Maxwell (2)		Second period	No scoring
0:32 - pp - Shane Harper (5)		Third period	No scoring
Kent Simpson (21 saves / 21 shots)		Goalie stats	Mark Guggenberger (29 saves / 33 shots)

March 27	Kelowna Rockets	5 – 4	Everett Silvertips	Prospera Place	Recap
18:15 - Shane McColgan (1)		First period	Scott MacDonald (2) - 4:33
7:10 - Tyson Barrie (1); 8:53 - Codey Ito (1)		Second period	Daniel Iwanski (3) - 12:36; Byron Froese (3) - pp - 18:45; Shane Harper (6) - pp - 19:47
9:11 - pp - Tyson Barrie (2); 9:33 - Lucas Bloodoff (1)		Third period	No scoring
Mark Guggenberger (12 saves / 16 shots)		Goalie stats	Kent Simpson (30 saves / 35 shots)

March 29	Everett Silvertips	1 – 2	Kelowna Rockets	Comcast Arena	Recap
No scoring		First period	Geordie Wudrick (8) - pp - 1:36
4:52 - pp - Chris Langkow (2)		Second period	Lucas Bloodoff (2) - 12:23
No scoring		Third period	No scoring
Kent Simpson (20 saves / 22 shots)		Goalie stats	Mark Guggenberger (40 saves / 41 shots)

Kelowna won series 4 – 3

==== (4) Spokane Chiefs vs. (5) Portland Winterhawks ====
March 20	Portland Winterhawks	4 – 5	Spokane Chiefs	Rose Garden	Recap
2:47 - Stefan Schneider (1); 9:31 - pp - Taylor Aronson (1)		First period	No scoring
15:37 - Brad Ross (1); 19:24 - Luca Sbisa (1)		Second period	Kyle Beach (1) - pp - 4:00; Steven Kuhn (1) - 6:03
No scoring		Third period	Stefan Ulmer (1) - pp - 4:37; Tyler Johnson (1) - 6:25; Kyle Beach (2) - 18:32
Mac Carruth (20 saves / 25 shots)		Goalie stats	James Reid (27 saves / 31 shots)

March 21	Portland Winterhawks	2 – 4	Spokane Chiefs	Rose Garden	Recap
4:04 - Troy Rutkowski (1)		First period	No scoring
No scoring		Second period	Kenton Miller (1) - 2:34; Mitch Wahl (1) - 10:19
19:39 - Brett Ponich (1)		Third period	Kenton Miller (2) - 6:11; Blake Gal (1) - en - 19:08
Mac Carruth (36 saves / 39 shots)		Goalie stats	James Reid (39 saves / 41 shots)

March 24	Spokane Chiefs	1 – 2	Portland Winterhawks	Spokane Veterans Memorial Arena	Recap
No scoring		First period	No scoring
12:10 - Kyle Beach (3)		Second period	Nino Niederreiter (1) - 5:22
No scoring		Third period	Troy Rutkowski (2) - 16:00
James Reid (47 saves / 49 shots)		Goalie stats	Mac Carruth (30 saves / 31 shots)

March 26	Spokane Chiefs	2 – 4	Portland Winterhawks	Spokane Veterans Memorial Arena	Recap
No scoring		First period	Luke Walker (1) - 6:15; Chris Francis (1) - 12:26
11:19 - pp - Tyler Johnson (2)		Second period	Chris Francis (2) - pp - 7:26
4:41 - pp - Kyle Beach (4)		Third period	Nino Niederreiter (2) - 4:09
James Reid (24 saves / 28 shots); Michael Tadjdeh (1 save / 1 shot)		Goalie stats	Mac Carruth (29 saves / 31 shots)

March 27	Spokane Chiefs	3 – 4	Portland Winterhawks	Spokane Veterans Memorial Arena	Recap
No scoring		First period	1:14 - Riley Boychuk (1); 17:48 - pp - Luke Walker (2)
No scoring		Second period	11:29 - pp - Ryan Johansen (1)
Jared Cowen (1) - pp - 6:08; Mitch Wahl (2) - 13:07; Kyle Beach (5) - 19:28		Third period	8:26 - Ryan Johansen (2)
James Reid (26 saves / 30 shots)		Goalie stats	Mac Carruth (36 saves / 39 shots)

March 29	Portland Winterhawks	3 – 4	Spokane Chiefs	Rose Garden	Recap
No scoring		First period	5:54 - pp - Kyle Beach (6); 11:11 - Levko Koper (1)
Troy Rutkowski (3) - pp - 4:21; Luke Walker (3) - 10:36		Second period	6:01 - Kenton Miller (3); 12:32 - Levko Koper (2)
Nino Niederreiter (3) - 6:36		Third period	No scoring
Mac Carruth (33 saves / 37 shots)		Goalie stats	James Reid (40 saves / 43 shots)

March 31	Spokane Chiefs	4 – 5	OT	Portland Winterhawks	Spokane Veterans Memorial Arena	Recap
Tyler Johnson (3) - 3:36; Mitch Wahl (3) - 11:03		First period		No scoring
Mitch Wahl (4) - 3:31		Second period		7:03 - Nino Niederreiter (4); 17:07 - Ryan Johansen (3)
Kyle Beach (7) - 6:50		Third period		9:45 - Riley Boychuk (2); 13:24 - Luke Walker (4)
No scoring		First overtime period		17:29 - Ty Rattie (1)
James Reid (44 saves / 49 shots)		Goalie stats		Mac Carruth (26 saves / 30 shots)

Portland won series 4 – 3

== Conference Semi-finals ==
=== Eastern Conference ===
==== (1) Calgary Hitmen vs. (5) Medicine Hat Tigers ====
April 2	Calgary Hitmen	5 – 2	Medicine Hat Tigers	Pengrowth Saddledome	Recap
14:52 - Kris Foucault (2); 15:20 - Del Cowan (3); 18:26 - pp - Kris Foucault (3)		First period	No scoring
17:09 - pp - Joel Broda (4)		Second period	Jace Coyle (3) - 18:25; Tristan King (2) - pp - 19:28
10:34 - Brandon Kozun (4)		Third period	No scoring
Martin Jones (15 saves / 17 shots)		Goalie stats	Tyler Bunz (24 saves / 29 shots)

April 4	Calgary Hitmen	4 – 0	Medicine Hat Tigers	Pengrowth Saddledome	Recap
No scoring		First period	No scoring
5:14 - Michael Stone (2); 11:11 - Tyler Shattock (3)		Second period	No scoring
7:48 - pp - Brandon Kozun (5); 13:22 - Tyler Shattock (4)		Third period	No scoring
Martin Jones (19 saves / 19 shots)		Goalie stats	Tyler Bunz (17 saves / 21 shots)

April 6	Medicine Hat Tigers	4 – 3	OT	Calgary Hitmen	Medicine Hat Arena	Recap
No scoring		First period		Giffen Nyren (3) - pp - 10:06
No scoring		Second period		Joel Broda (5) - pp - 12:39
6:52 - Mark Isherwood (2); 11:53 - pp - Linden Vey (2); 14:50 - Emerson Etem (5)		Third period		Joel Broda (6) - 14:04
8:26 - Emerson Etem (6)		First overtime period		No scoring
Tyler Bunz (28 saves / 31 shots)		Goalie stats		Martin Jones (29 saves / 33 shots)

April 7	Medicine Hat Tigers	1 – 4	Calgary Hitmen	Medicine Hat Arena	Recap
8:13 - pp - Zdeněk Okál (1)		First period	Joel Broda (7) - pp - 19:55
No scoring		Second period	Cody Sylvester (6) - 13:27
No scoring		Third period	Kris Foucault (4) - 13:20; Cody Sylvester (7) - en - 17:53
Tyler Bunz (23 saves / 26 shots)		Goalie stats	Martin Jones (18 saves / 19 shots)

April 9	Calgary Hitmen	4 – 5	Medicine Hat Tigers	Pengrowth Saddledome	Recap
1:30 - pp - Matt MacKenzie (2); 6:43 - Tyler Shattock (5); 7:04 - Cody Sylvester (8)		First period	Matt MacKay (2) - pp - 5:44
No scoring		Second period	Matt MacKay (3) - 16:00; Wacey Hamilton (3) - 19:00
15:11 - Giffen Nyren (4)		Third period	Bretton Cameron (2) - 7:16; Thomas Carr (1) - 14:10
Martin Jones (24 saves / 29 shots)		Goalie stats	Tyler Bunz (35 saves / 39 shots)

April 11	Medicine Hat Tigers	2 – 3	OT	Calgary Hitmen	Medicine Hat Arena	Recap
2:45 - Emerson Etem (7)		First period		Joel Broda (8) - 3:23
No scoring		Second period		No scoring
0:18 - pp - Tristan King (3)		Third period		Kris Foucault (5) - 17:53
No scoring		First overtime period		Kris Foucault (6) - 18:17
Tyler Bunz (43 saves / 46 shots)		Goalie stats		Martin Jones (25 saves / 27 shots)

Calgary won series 4 – 2

==== (2) Brandon Wheat Kings vs. (3) Saskatoon Blades ====
April 2	Saskatoon Blades	5 – 6	Brandon Wheat Kings	Credit Union Centre	Recap
16:42 - pp - Marek Viedenský (3)		First period	Michael Ferland (1) - 1:43; Michael Ferland (2) - 5:00
2:08 - pp - Stefan Elliott (3); 2:57 - Marek Viedenský (4); 6:47 - pp - Jeremy Boyer (2); 10:30 - sh - Walker Wintoneak (2)		Second period	Brenden Walker (1) - 3:31; Brayden Schenn (6) - pp - 9:21; Michael Ferland (3) - 12:23
No scoring		Third period	Brent Raedeke (2) - 10:29
Steven Stanford (24 saves / 30 shots)		Goalie stats	Jacob DeSerres (35 saves / 40 shots)

April 3	Saskatoon Blades	1 – 4	Brandon Wheat Kings	Credit Union Centre	Recap
No scoring		First period	No scoring
12:52 - Travis Toomey (1)		Second period	Toni Rajala (1) - 5:01; Brent Raedeke (3) - pp - 10:17
No scoring		Third period	Brent Raedeke (4) - 8:35; Matt Calvert (4) - pp - 15:53
Steven Stanford (27 saves / 31 shots)		Goalie stats	Andrew Hayes (30 saves / 31 shots)

April 7	Brandon Wheat Kings	4 – 5	Saskatoon Blades	Westman Place	Recap
No scoring		First period	No scoring
1:55 - Shayne Wiebe (1); 8:16 - pp - Colby Robak (1); 13:18 - Scott Glennie (2)		Second period	Walker Wintoneak (3) - 1:33; Jyri Niemi (2) - 14:34; Derek Hulak (1) - 16:38
18:54 - Brent Raedeke (5)		Third period	Darian Dziurzynski (2) - 3:00; Darian Dziurzynski (3) - 8:27
Andrew Hayes (23 saves / 28 shots)		Goalie stats	Steven Stanford (32 saves / 36 shots)

April 9	Brandon Wheat Kings	3 – 4	Saskatoon Blades	Westman Place	Recap
18:15 - Colby Robak (2)		First period	Marek Viedenský (5) - 10:52
3:41 - pp - Aaron Lewadniuk (4)		Second period	No scoring
19:29 - Brayden Schenn (7)		Third period	Derek Hulak (2) - 5:34; Walker Wintoneak (4) - 14:48; Jeremy Boyer (3) - en - 19:18
Jacob DeSerres (26 saves / 29 shots)		Goalie stats	Steven Stanford (31 saves / 34 shots)

April 10	Brandon Wheat Kings	3 – 2	Saskatoon Blades	Westman Place	Recap
Aaron Lewadniuk (5) - pp - 14:58		First period	19:47 - Marek Viedenský (6)
Alexander Urbom (3) - 15:17		Second period	18:42 - pp - Sena Acolatse (1)
Toni Rajala (2) - 17:55		Third period	No scoring
Jacob DeSerres (34 saves / 36 shots)		Goalie stats	Steven Stanford (38 saves / 41 shots)

April 12	Saskatoon Blades	4 – 5	Brandon Wheat Kings	Credit Union Centre	Recap
Marek Viedenský (7) - 10:06		First period	No scoring
Jeremy Boyer (4) - pp - 0:41; Gaelan Patterson (4) - 1:11		Second period	4:03 - Colby Robak (3); 9:48 - pp - Aaron Lewadniuk (6); 19:46 - Scott Glennie (3)
Charles Inglis (1) - 7:11		Third period	5:07 - Shayne Wiebe (2); 8:09 - Matt Calvert (5)
Steven Stanford (30 saves / 35 shots)		Goalie stats	Jacob DeSerres (33 saves / 37 shots)

Brandon won series 4 – 2

=== Western Conference ===
==== (1) Tri-City Americans vs. (6) Kelowna Rockets ====
April 2	Tri-City Americans	5 – 3	Kelowna Rockets	Toyota Center	Recap
7:45 - Tyler Schmidt (1); 15:18 - Justin Feser (1)		First period	Geordie Wudrick (9) - 0:43; Lucas Bloodoff (3) - pp - 19:57
No scoring		Second period	No scoring
4:21 - pp - Adam Hughesman (1); 4:46 - Sergei Drozd (3); 16:31 - Johnny Lazo (2)		Third period	Brandon McMillan (1) - 15:19
Drew Owsley (26 saves / 29 shots)		Goalie stats	Mark Guggenberger (38 saves / 43 shots)

April 3	Tri-City Americans	2 – 3	Kelowna Rockets	Toyota Center	Recap
2:36 - Sergei Drozd (4)		First period	Spencer Main (2) - 12:15
No scoring		Second period	No scoring
19:56 - Brendan Shinnimin (6)		Third period	Lucas Bloodoff (4) - 6:18; Brandon McMillan - en - 19:15
Drew Owsley (25 saves / 27 shots)		Goalie stats	Mark Guggenberger (35 saves / 37 shots)

April 6	Kelowna Rockets	0 – 2	Tri-City Americans	Prospera Place	Recap
No scoring		First period	Sergei Drozd (5) - 15:04
No scoring		Second period	Johnny Lazo (3) - 15:51
No scoring		Third period	No scoring
Mark Guggenberger (22 saves / 24 shots)		Goalie stats	Drew Owsley (31 saves / 31 shots)

April 7	Kelowna Rockets	2 – 3	Tri-City Americans	Prospera Place	Recap
No scoring		First period	Tyler Schmidt (2) - 5:33
9:18 - pp - Tyson Barrie (3)		Second period	Brock Sutherland (1) - 9:36
10:41 - Brandon McMillan (3)		Third period	Kruise Reddick (5) - pp - 11:51
Mark Guggenberger (10 saves / 13 shots)		Goalie stats	Drew Owsley (33 saves / 35 shots)

April 9	Tri-City Americans	4 – 3	OT	Kelowna Rockets	Toyota Center	Recap
No scoring		First period		Brandon McMillan (4) - sh - 8:55
No scoring		Second period		Brandon McMillan (5) - 8:13
5:00 - pp - Sergei Drozd (6); 12:44 - Sergei Drozd (7); 18:36 - Johnny Lazo (4)		Third period		Lucas Bloodoff (5) - 12:03
5:37 - Kruise Reddick (6)		First overtime period		No scoring
Drew Owsley (36 saves / 39 shots)		Goalie stats		Mark Guggenberger (37 saves / 41 shots)

Tri-City won series 4 – 1

==== (2) Vancouver Giants vs. (5) Portland Winterhawks ====
April 3	Portland Winterhawks	6 – 9	Vancouver Giants	Memorial Coliseum	Recap
12:47 - sh - Stefan Schneider (2)		First period	James Henry (4) - 6:33; Craig Cunningham (6) - 8:44
7:17 - Seth Swenson (1); 8:47 - Ryan Johansen (4)		Second period	Brett Breitkreuz (3) - 2:02; Brendan Gallagher (5) - 17:49; Brendan Gallagher (6) - pp - 19:12
5:08 - Taylor Aronson (2); 6:55 - Brad Ross (2); 17:59 - Ty Rattie (2)		Third period	Brendan Gallagher (7) - 2:50; James Wright (1) - 10:53; Lance Bouma (2) - 13:33; Brendan Gallagher (8) - pp - en - 18:50
Mac Carruth (35 saves / 41 shots); Ian Curtis (5 saves / 7 shots)		Goalie stats	Mark Segal (31 saves / 37 shots)

April 4	Portland Winterhawks	4 – 7	Vancouver Giants	Memorial Coliseum	Recap
1:35 - Oliver Gabriel (1)		First period	James Wright (2) - 10:19; Craig Cunningham (7) - 12:54; James Henry (5); Craig Cunningham (8) - pp - 17:48
3:15 - pp - Eric Doyle (1); 14:18 - Chris Francis (3); 17:36 - pp - Troy Rutkowski (4)		Second period	David Musil (1) - 7:42; Milan Kytnár (2) - 9:12
No scoring		Third period	Lance Bouma (3) - en - 19:06
Mac Carruth (16 saves / 20 shots); Ian Curtis (27 saves / 29 shots)		Goalie stats	Mark Segal (44 saves / 48 shots)

April 7	Vancouver Giants	2 – 3	Portland Winterhawks	Pacific Coliseum	Recap
No scoring		First period	Spencer Bennett (1) - pp - 1:11
1:44 - James Wright (3)		Second period	Luke Walker (5) - 18:43
17:04 - pp - James Wright (4)		Third period	Luca Sbisa (2) - pp - 2:20
Mark Segal (35 saves / 38 shots)		Goalie stats	Ian Curtis (29 saves / 31 shots)

April 9	Vancouver Giants	5 – 3	Portland Winterhawks	Pacific Coliseum	Recap
18:57 - James Wright (5)		First period	No scoring
3:57 - Craig Cunningham (9); 7:04 - pp - James Wright (6); 16:23 - pp - Tomáš Vincour (2)		Second period	Ryan Johansen (5) - 5:28; Oliver Gabriel (2) - 8:21
7:59 - Craig Cunningham (10)		Third period	Nino Niederreiter (5) - 15:28
Mark Segal (33 saves / 36 shots)		Goalie stats	Ian Curtis (24 saves / 29 shots)

April 10	Vancouver Giants	4 – 5	Portland Winterhawks	Pacific Coliseum	Recap
No scoring		First period	11:29 - pp - Nino Niederreiter (6); 18:36 - Nino Niederreiter (7)
Tomáš Vincour (3) - 11:21; Kevin Connauton (3) - pp - 12:27; Tomáš Vincour (4) - pp - 13:14		Second period	2:22 - Luke Walker (6); 14:17 - Ryan Johansen (6)
Craig Cunningham (11) - 9:07		Third period	4:52 - Stefan Schneider (3)
Mark Segal (34 saves / 39 shots)		Goalie stats	Mac Carruth (36 saves / 40 shots)

April 13	Portland Winterhawks	1 – 3	Vancouver Giants	Memorial Coliseum	Recap
Nino Niederreiter (8) - pp - 8:33		First period	8:02 - sh - Brendan Gallagher (9)
No scoring		Second period	7:25 - pp - Tomáš Vincour (5)
No scoring		Third period	9:31 - pp - James Henry (6)
Mac Carruth (26 saves / 29 shots)		Goalie stats	Mark Segal (32 saves / 33 shots)

Vancouver won series 4 – 2

== Conference Finals ==
=== Eastern Conference ===
==== (1) Calgary Hitmen vs. (2) Brandon Wheat Kings ====
April 16	Calgary Hitmen	2 – 4	Brandon Wheat Kings	Pengrowth Saddledome	Recap
10:37 - pp - Zak Stebner (2)		First period	Toni Rajala (3) - pp - 15:32
No scoring		Second period	Travis Hamonic (3) - 2:37
17:41 - Joel Broda (9)		Third period	Brayden Schenn (8) - 9:03; Matt Calvert (6) - en - 19:59
Martin Jones (26 saves / 29 shots)		Goalie stats	Jacob DeSerres (33 saves / 35 shots)

April 17	Calgary Hitmen	3 – 2	OT	Brandon Wheat Kings	Pengrowth Saddledome	Recap
8:23 - Tyler Fiddler (2); 18:51 - Mikhail Fisenko (3)		First period		No scoring
No scoring		Second period		Paul Ciarelli (1) - 8:50; Travis Hamonic (4) - pp - 14:36
No scoring		Third period		No scoring
2:23 - pp - Ian Schultz (6)		First overtime period		No scoring
Martin Jones (24 saves / 26 shots)		Goalie stats		Jacob DeSerres (28 saves / 31 shots)

April 20	Brandon Wheat Kings	3 – 6	Calgary Hitmen	Westman Place	Recap
No scoring		First period	Cody Sylvester (9) - 5:00; Michael Stone (3) - 6:36; Joel Broda (10) - pp - 14:02; Matt MacKenzie (3) - 15:18
9:09 - sh - Matt Calvert (7); 12:52 - sh - Matt Calvert (8); 15:54 - sh - Matt Calvert (9)		Second period	No scoring
No scoring		Third period	Tyler Fiddler (3) - 18:10; Tyler Fiddler (4) - en - 18:29
Jacob DeSerres (15 saves / 20 shots)		Goalie stats	Martin Jones (40 saves / 43 shots)

April 21	Brandon Wheat Kings	3 – 4	Calgary Hitmen	Westman Place	Recap
1:02 - Alexander Urbom (4); 2:59 - Toni Rajala (4)		First period	No scoring
No scoring		Second period	Ian Schultz (7) - 1:44; Kris Foucault (7) - 5:02; Kris Foucault (8) - 6:38
17:08 - Brenden Walker (2)		Third period	Joel Broda (11) - 11:42
Jacob DeSerres (20 saves / 24 shots)		Goalie stats	Martin Jones (34 saves / 37 shots)

April 23	Calgary Hitmen	6 – 1	Brandon Wheat Kings	Pengrowth Saddledome	Recap
10:40 - Joel Broda (12); 18:27 - Mikhail Fisenko (4)		First period	No scoring
0:15 - Brandon Kozun (6)		Second period	No scoring
6:29 - Jaynen Rissling (1); 17:51 - pp - Brandon Kozun (7); 18:18 - pp - Matt MacKenzie (4)		Third period	Mark Stone (1) - 12:00
Martin Jones (20 saves / 21 shots)		Goalie stats	Jacob DeSerres (33 saves / 39 shots)

Calgary won series 4 – 1

=== Western Conference ===
==== (1) Tri-City Americans vs. (2) Vancouver Giants ====
April 16	Tri-City Americans	2 – 4	Vancouver Giants	Toyota Center	Recap
0:35 - pp - Tyler Schmidt (3); 19:29 - pp - Tyler Schmidt (4)		First period	James Henry (7) - 16:42
No scoring		Second period	Brendan Gallagher (10) - 1:45; Greg Lamoureux (1) - 4:18
No scoring		Third period	Tomáš Vincour (6) - pp - 10:28
Drew Owsley (19 saves / 23 shots)		Goalie stats	Mark Segal (42 saves / 44 shots)

April 17	Tri-City Americans	4 – 0	Vancouver Giants	Toyota Center	Recap
7:50 - Jordan Messier (3)		First period	No scoring
0:33 - pp - Brendan Shinnimin (7); 4:31 - Johnny Lazo (5)		Second period	No scoring
2:59 - Kruise Reddick (7)		Third period	No scoring
Drew Owsley (26 saves / 26 shots)		Goalie stats	Mark Segal (22 saves / 26 shots)

April 20	Vancouver Giants	3 – 2	OT	Tri-City Americans	Pacific Coliseum	Recap
4:33 - James Wright (7); 11:49 - pp - Neil Manning (1)		First period		No scoring
No scoring		Second period		Brooks Macek (5) - pp - 14:50
No scoring		Third period		Jordan Messier (4) - pp - 9:03
3:49 - Tomáš Vincour		First overtime period		No scoring
Mark Segal (33 saves / 35 shots)		Goalie stats		Drew Owsley (24 saves / 27 shots)

April 22	Vancouver Giants	2 – 5	Tri-City Americans	Pacific Coliseum	Recap
9:32 - pp - Brendan Gallagher (11)		First period	Brett Plouffe (1) - 11:49
7:53 - pp - David Musil (2)		Second period	Jordan Messier (5) - 5:01; Adam Hughesman (2) - pp - 10:49
No scoring		Third period	Kruise Reddick (8) - en - 19:13; Justin Feser (2) - en - 19:33
Mark Segal (20 saves / 23 shots)		Goalie stats	Drew Owsley (30 saves / 32 shots)

April 23	Tri-City Americans	4 – 1	Vancouver Giants	Toyota Center	Recap
4:31 - Zachary Yuen (1)		First period	No scoring
9:56 - pp - Tyler Schmidt (5); 12:27 - pp - Brooks Macek (6)		Second period	Lance Bouma (4) - 5:13
18:09 - Brendan Shinnimin (8)		Third period	No scoring
Drew Owsley (40 saves / 41 shots)		Goalie stats	Mark Segal (27 saves / 31 shots)

April 25	Vancouver Giants	2 – 5	Tri-City Americans	Pacific Coliseum	Recap
9:27 - pp - Milan Kytnár (3)		First period	Johnny Lazo (6) - pp - 10:08; Justin Feser (3) - pp - 12:49
7:35 - pp - Craig Cunningham (12)		Second period	No scoring
No scoring		Third period	Patrick Holland (3) - 0:26; Kruise Reddick (9) - pp - 3:06; Sergei Drozd (8) - 13:59
Mark Segal (27 saves / 32 shots)		Goalie stats	Drew Owsley (30 saves / 32 shots)

Tri-City won series 4 – 2

== WHL Championship ==
=== (E1) Calgary Hitmen vs. (W1) Tri-City Americans ===
April 30	Calgary Hitmen	7 – 0	Tri-City Americans	Pengrowth Saddledome	Recap
6:08 - Cody Sylvester (10); 9:12 - pp - Matt MacKenzie (5); 10:01 - pp - Matt MacKenzie (6); 10:52 - Mikhail Fisenko (5)		First period	No scoring
5:28 - Brandon Kozun (8); 19:20 - Mikhail Fisenko (6)		Second period	No scoring
15:12 - Cody Beach (1)		Third period	No scoring
Martin Jones (26 saves / 26 shots)		Goalie stats	Drew Owsley (5 saves / 9 shots); Alexander Pechursky (11 saves / 14 shots)

May 1	Calgary Hitmen	4 – 1	Tri-City Americans	Pengrowth Saddledome	Recap
10:11 - Joel Broda (13)		First period	No scoring
2:40 - Peter Kosterman (1); 3:53 - Del Cowan (4)		Second period	Johnny Lazo (7) - 4:34
17:06 - Tyler Fiddler (5)		Third period	No scoring
Martin Jones (21 saves / 22 shots)		Goalie stats	Drew Owsley (12 saves / 15 shots); Alexander Pechursky (22 saves / 23 shots)

May 4	Tri-City Americans	1 – 4	Calgary Hitmen	Toyota Center	Recap
No scoring		First period	Kris Foucault (9) - 12:16; Mikhail Fisenko (7) - pp - 18:39; Cody Sylvester (11) - 19:37
No scoring		Second period	No scoring
17:25 - pp - Kruise Reddick (10)		Third period	Ian Schultz (8) - sh - en - 19:14
Alexander Pechursky (31 saves / 34 shots)		Goalie stats	Martin Jones (29 saves / 30 shots)

May 5	Tri-City Americans	4 – 2	Calgary Hitmen	Toyota Center	Recap
9:51 - Jordan Messier (6); 14:13 - Mason Wilgosh (1)		First period	Mackenzie Royer (1) - 16:38
No scoring		Second period	No scoring
0:20 - pp - Kruise Reddick (11); 15:29 - Justin Feser (4)		Third period	Giffen Nyren (5) - 18:27
Alexander Pechursky (40 saves / 42 shots)		Goalie stats	Martin Jones (26 saves / 30 shots)

May 7	Calgary Hitmen	4 – 1	Tri-City Americans	Pengrowth Saddledome	Recap
6:03 - pp - Mikhail Fisenko (8)		First period	Adam Hughesman (3) - 5:02
6:43 - Michael Stone (4); 9:57 - pp - Michael Stone (5); 13:34 - Tyler Fiddler (6)		Second period	No scoring
No scoring		Third period	No scoring
Martin Jones (32 saves / 33 shots)		Goalie stats	Alexander Pechursky (23 saves / 27 shots)

Calgary won series 4 – 1

== Playoff scoring leaders ==
Note: GP = Games played; G = Goals; A = Assists; Pts = Points; PIM = Penalty minutes

Player	Team	GP	G	A	Pts	PIM
Brendan Shinnimin	Tri-City Americans	22	8	17	25	29
Craig Cunningham	Vancouver Giants	16	12	12	24	12
Kruise Reddick	Tri-City Americans	22	11	13	24	19
Brendan Gallagher	Vancouver Giants	22	11	10	21	14
Brayden Schenn	Vancouver Giants	15	8	11	19	2
Mikhail Fisenko	Calgary Hitmen	23	8	11	19	18
Justin Feser	Tri-City Americans	22	4	14	18	14
Brooks Macek	Tri-City Americans	21	6	11	17	17
Adam Hughesman	Tri-City Americans	22	3	14	17	18
Kris Foucault	Calgary Hitmen	22	9	7	16	21

== Playoff leading goaltenders ==
Note: GP = Games played; Mins = Minutes played; W = Wins; L = Losses; GA = Goals Allowed; SO = Shutouts; SV& = Save percentage; GAA = Goals against average

Player	Team	GP	Mins	W	L	GA	SO	Sv%	GAA
Drew Owsley	Tri-City Americans	19	1043	12	7	43	2	0.921	2.47
Kent Simpson	Everett Silvertips	5	298	2	3	13	1	0.908	2.62
Steven Stanford	Saskatoon Blades	10	602	6	4	28	2	0.916	2.79
Tyler Bunz	Medicine Hat Tigers	12	720	6	6	35	0	0.899	2.92
Alexander Pechursky	Tri-City Americans	7	305	1	2	15	0	0.909	2.95

== Memorial Cup ==
The 92nd Memorial Cup was held in Brandon, Manitoba.

== WHL awards ==
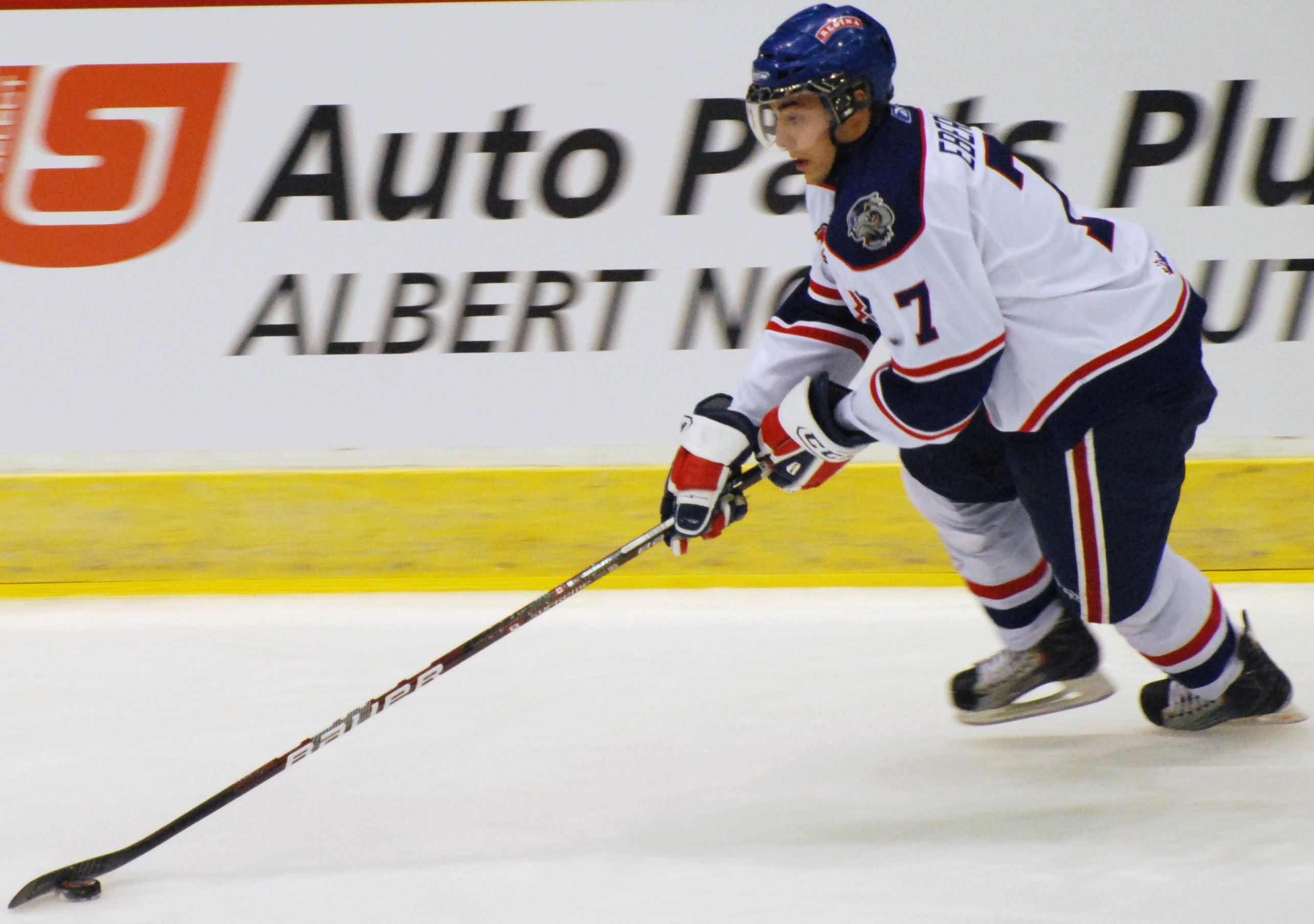
Jordan Eberle was awarded the Four Broncos Memorial Trophy as the league's player of the year

Scotty Munro Memorial Trophy	Regular season champions	Calgary Hitmen	
Four Broncos Memorial Trophy	Player of the Year	Jordan Eberle	Regina Pats
Bob Clarke Trophy	Top Scorer	Brandon Kozun	Calgary Hitmen
Bill Hunter Trophy	Top Defenseman	Tyson Barrie	Kelowna Rockets
Jim Piggott Memorial Trophy	Rookie of the Year	Ryan Nugent-Hopkins	Red Deer Rebels
Del Wilson Trophy	Top Goaltender	Martin Jones	Calgary Hitmen
WHL Plus-Minus Award	Top Plus-Minus Rating	Colby Robak	Brandon Wheat Kings
Brad Hornung Trophy	Most Sportsmanlike Player	Jason Bast	Moose Jaw Warriors
Daryl K. (Doc) Seaman Trophy	Scholastic Player of the Year	Adam Lowry	Swift Current Broncos
Jim Donlevy Memorial Trophy	Scholastic team of the Year	Tri-City Americans	
Dunc McCallum Memorial Trophy	Coach of the Year	Mark Holick	Kootenay Ice
Lloyd Saunders Memorial Trophy	Executive of the Year	Kelly McCrimmon	Brandon Wheat Kings
Allen Paradice Memorial Trophy	Top Official	Chris Savage	
St. Clair Group Trophy	Marketing/Public Relations Award	Zoran Rajcic	Everett Silvertips
Doug Wickenheiser Memorial Trophy	Humanitarian of the Year	Matt Fraser	Kootenay Ice
WHL Playoff MVP	WHL Finals Most Valuable Player	Martin Jones	Calgary Hitmen
Professional Hockey Achievement; Academic Recipient	Alumni Achievement Awards	Joe Sakic; Gavin McLeod	

=== All-Star teams ===
==== Eastern Conference ====
First Team		Pos.	Second Team	
Player	Team	Pos.	Player	Team
Martin Jones	Calgary Hitmen	G	Darcy Kuemper	Red Deer Rebels
Michael Stone	Calgary Hitmen	D	Travis Hamonic	Brandon Wheat Kings
Brayden McNabb	Kootenay Ice	D	Colby Robak	Brandon Wheat Kings
Jordan Eberle*	Regina Pats	F	Dustin Sylvester	Kootenay Ice
Brayden Schenn	Brandon Wheat Kings	F	Matt Calvert	Brandon Wheat Kings
Brandon Kozun	Calgary Hitmen	F	Cody Eakin	Swift Current Broncos

==== Western Conference ====
First Team		Pos.	Second Team	
Player	Team	Pos.	Player	Team
Calvin Pickard	Seattle Thunderbirds	G	Drew Owsley	Tri-City Americans
Tyson Barrie	Kelowna Rockets	D	Jared Cowen	Spokane Chiefs
Kevin Connauton	Vancouver Giants	D	Radko Gudas	Everett Silvertips
Craig Cunningham*	Vancouver Giants	F	Shane Harper	Everett Silvertips
Kyle Beach	Spokane Chiefs	F	Nino Niederreiter	Portland Winterhawks
Mitch Wahl	Spokane Chiefs	F	Prab Rai	Seattle Thunderbirds

- denotes unanimous selection

== See also ==
- List of WHL seasons
- 2009–10 OHL season
- 2009–10 QMJHL season
- 2009 NHL entry draft
- 2009 in ice hockey
- 2010 in ice hockey

Preceded by 2008–09 WHL season	WHL seasons	Succeeded by 2010–11 WHL season
