= Stefan Schneider (ice hockey, born 1989) =

Canadian ice hockey player

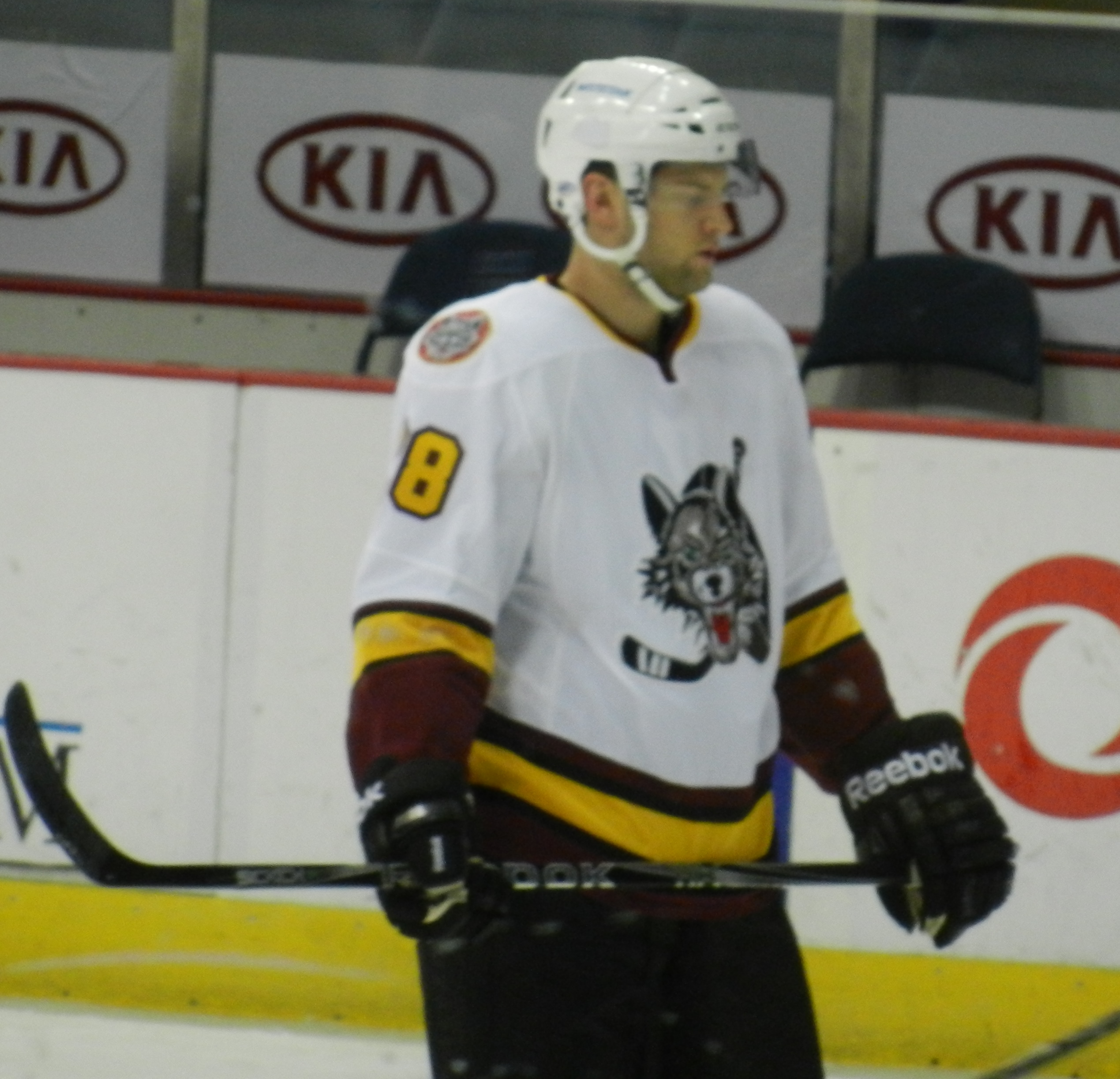
- Schneider with the Chicago Wolves in 2011
- Born: December 13, 1989 (age 36) Vernon, British Columbia, Canada
- Height: 6 ft 4 in (193 cm)
- Weight: 203 lb (92 kg; 14 st 7 lb)
- Position: Right wing
- Shot: Right
- Played for: Manitoba Moose; Chicago Wolves; Kalamazoo Wings; Peoria Rivermen
- NHL draft: Undrafted
- Playing career: 2010–2013

Stefan Schneider (born December 13, 1989) is a Canadian former professional ice hockey winger who played three seasons of professional ice hockey in the American Hockey League (AHL) and ECHL.

== Early life ==
Schneider was born in Vernon, British Columbia. He played major junior hockey in the Western Hockey League, where he scored 43 points in 175 games played.

== Career ==
On March 29, 2010, the Vancouver Canucks of the National Hockey League signed Schneider as a free agent to an entry-level contract. He last played for the Peoria Rivermen in the AHL.

== Career statistics ==
			Regular season					Playoffs
Season	Team	League	GP	G	A	Pts	PIM	GP	G	A	Pts	PIM
2006–07	Beaver Valley Nitehawks	KIJHL	44	7	18	25	30	13	2	5	7	10
2006–07	Vernon Vipers	BCHL	5	0	0	0	4	—	—	—	—	—
2007–08	Vancouver Giants	WHL	36	0	4	4	36	4	0	0	0	0
2008–09	Portland Winter Hawks	WHL	67	11	5	16	45	—	—	—	—	—
2009–10	Portland Winterhawks	WHL	72	12	11	23	42	13	3	2	5	10
2010–11	Manitoba Moose	AHL	47	2	2	4	9	3	0	0	0	0
2011–12	Chicago Wolves	AHL	46	4	5	9	6	3	0	0	0	0
2012–13	Chicago Wolves	AHL	32	2	5	7	12	—	—	—	—	—
2012–13	Kalamazoo Wings	ECHL	8	1	1	2	9	—	—	—	—	—
2012–13	Peoria Rivermen	AHL	2	0	0	0	0	—	—	—	—	—
AHL totals			127	8	12	20	27	6	0	0	0	0
