= Taylor Aronson =

American ice hockey player

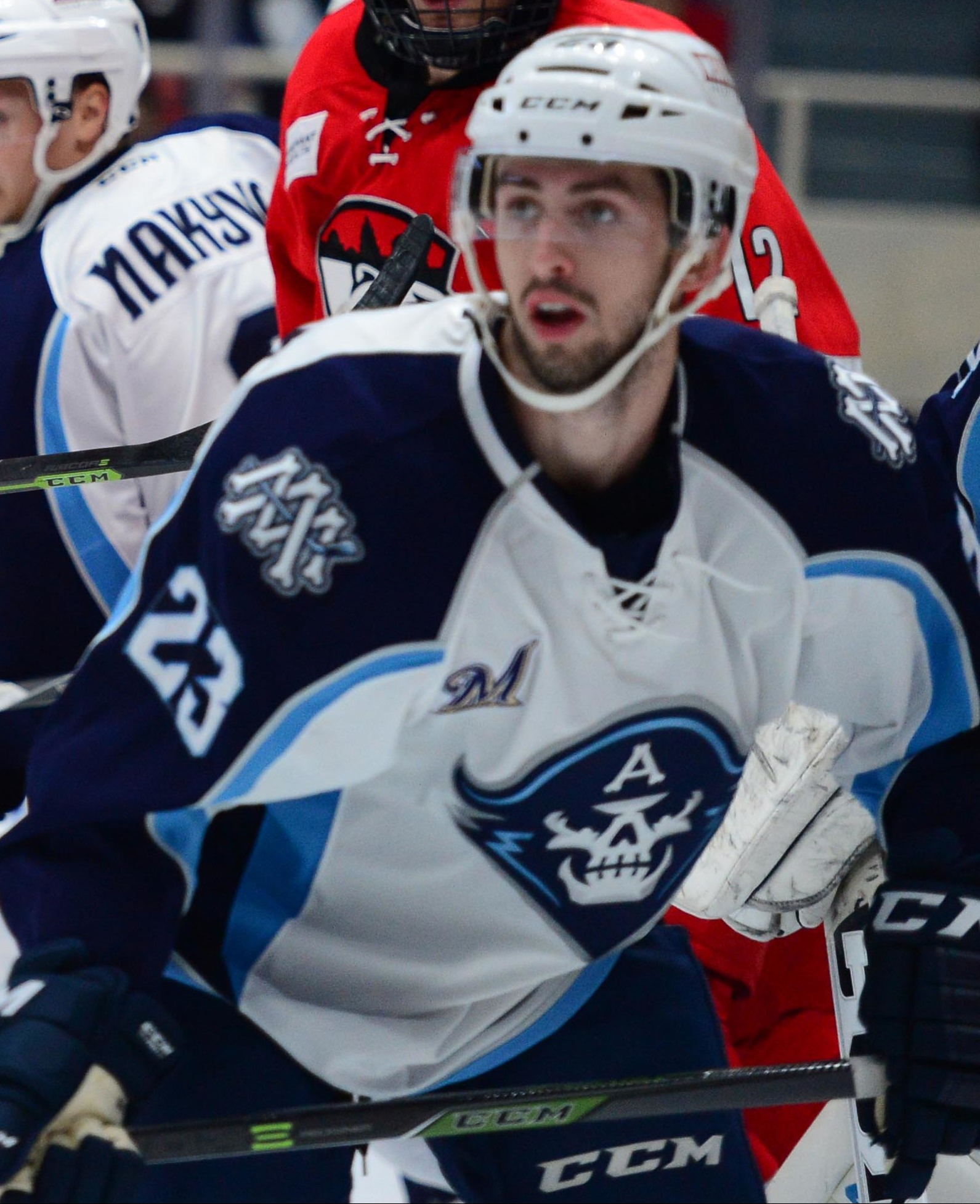
- Aronson with the Milwaukee Admirals in 2015
- Born: December 30, 1991 (age 34) Placentia, California, U.S.
- Height: 6 ft 1 in (185 cm)
- Weight: 196 lb (89 kg; 14 st 0 lb)
- Position: Defense
- Shot: Right
- Played for: Milwaukee Admirals; Lada Togliatti; Thomas Sabo Ice Tigers; Kölner Haie
- NHL draft: 78th overall, 2010; Nashville Predators
- Playing career: 2011–2020

Taylor Aronson (born December 30, 1991) is an American former professional ice hockey defenseman. Aronson was selected by the Nashville Predators in the 3rd round (78th overall) of the 2010 NHL entry draft.

== Playing career ==
Aronson played junior hockey with the Portland Winterhawks in the Western Hockey League. On December 28, 2010, he was signed to the Nashville Predators on a three-year entry-level contract.

After five seasons within the Predators organization, primarily with American Hockey League affiliate, the Milwaukee Admirals. In 2016, Aronson abandoned his team before playoffs because he did not get called up to the Predators.

He agreed to a one-year contract with a Russian club, HC Lada Togliatti of the Kontinental Hockey League (KHL) on May 23, 2016.

Aronson moved and played in two successful seasons establishing himself in the DEL with the Thomas Sabo Ice Tigers. At the conclusion of his contract with the Ice Tigers, Aronson secured a one-year contract to remain in Germany, signing with Kölner Haie on May 8, 2019.

== Career statistics ==
			Regular season					Playoffs
Season	Team	League	GP	G	A	Pts	PIM	GP	G	A	Pts	PIM
2009–10	Portland Winterhawks	WHL	71	5	25	30	65	11	2	7	9	13
2010–11	Portland Winterhawks	WHL	71	5	32	37	81	21	0	2	2	20
2011–12	Milwaukee Admirals	AHL	14	0	1	1	8	—	—	—	—	—
2011–12	Cincinnati Cyclones	ECHL	40	6	12	18	49	—	—	—	—	—
2012–13	Cincinnati Cyclones	ECHL	38	1	12	13	12	2	0	0	0	0
2012–13	Milwaukee Admirals	AHL	12	0	2	2	4	—	—	—	—	—
2013–14	Cincinnati Cyclones	ECHL	65	6	32	38	57	24	0	7	7	18
2014–15	Milwaukee Admirals	AHL	73	3	29	32	27	—	—	—	—	—
2015–16	Milwaukee Admirals	AHL	64	4	36	40	24	—	—	—	—	—
2016–17	HC Lada Togliatti	KHL	51	2	13	15	35	—	—	—	—	—
2017–18	Thomas Sabo Ice Tigers	DEL	52	6	24	30	34	12	0	2	2	8
2018–19	Thomas Sabo Ice Tigers	DEL	43	1	14	15	50	—	—	—	—	—
2019–20	Kölner Haie	DEL	50	2	7	9	32	—	—	—	—	—
AHL totals			163	7	68	75	63	—	—	—	—	—
KHL totals			51	2	13	15	35	—	—	—	—	—
