= Kurtis Mucha =

Canadian ice hockey player (born 1989)

- Born: June 3, 1989 (age 37) Sherwood Park, Alberta, Canada
- Height: 6 ft 2 in (188 cm)
- Weight: 184 lb (83 kg; 13 st 2 lb)
- Position: Goaltender
- Caught: Left
- Played for: Idaho Steelheads; Stockton Thunder
- NHL draft: Undrafted
- Playing career: 2010–2016

Kurtis Mucha (born June 3, 1989) is a Canadian former professional ice hockey goaltender.

Mucha played major junior hockey, with the Portland Winter Hawks and Kamloops Blazers, in the Western Hockey League (WHL) from 2005 to 2010 where he played a total of 245 games and 13,708 minutes in net to established new WHL records for most career games and most career minutes played by a goaltender.

Mucha played professional hockey in the ECHL with the Idaho Steelheads during the 2008–09 ECHL season and with the Stockton Thunder during the 2009–10 ECHL season.

On December 11, 2013, Mucha attended practice at Rexall Place with the NHL's Boston Bruins, filling in for Tuukka Rask, who was suffering from flu-like symptoms.

On March 4, 2014, Mucha dressed as the backup goalie for his local Edmonton Oilers who had just finalized a trade to send Ilya Bryzgalov to the Minnesota Wild, leaving them without a number 2 netminder. Mucha signed a one-day NHL tryout contract which afforded him the opportunity to be on the roster for the game against the Ottawa Senators.

== Awards and honours ==
Award	Year	Ref
WHL record - Most career games played by a goalie (245)	Established 2010	
WHL record - Most career minutes played by a goalie (13,786)	Established 2010	
CIS All-Canadian First Team	2012–13	
CIS Goaltender of the Year	2012–13	

Preceded by Kyle Moir (233)	WHL Record - Career games played by a goalie (245); 2010 - present	Succeeded by Incumbent
Preceded by Kyle Moir (12,774)	WHL Record - Career minutes played by a goalie (13,708); 2010 - 2012	Succeeded by Calvin Pickard
