= Mikhail Fisenko =

Russian ice hockey player (born 1990)

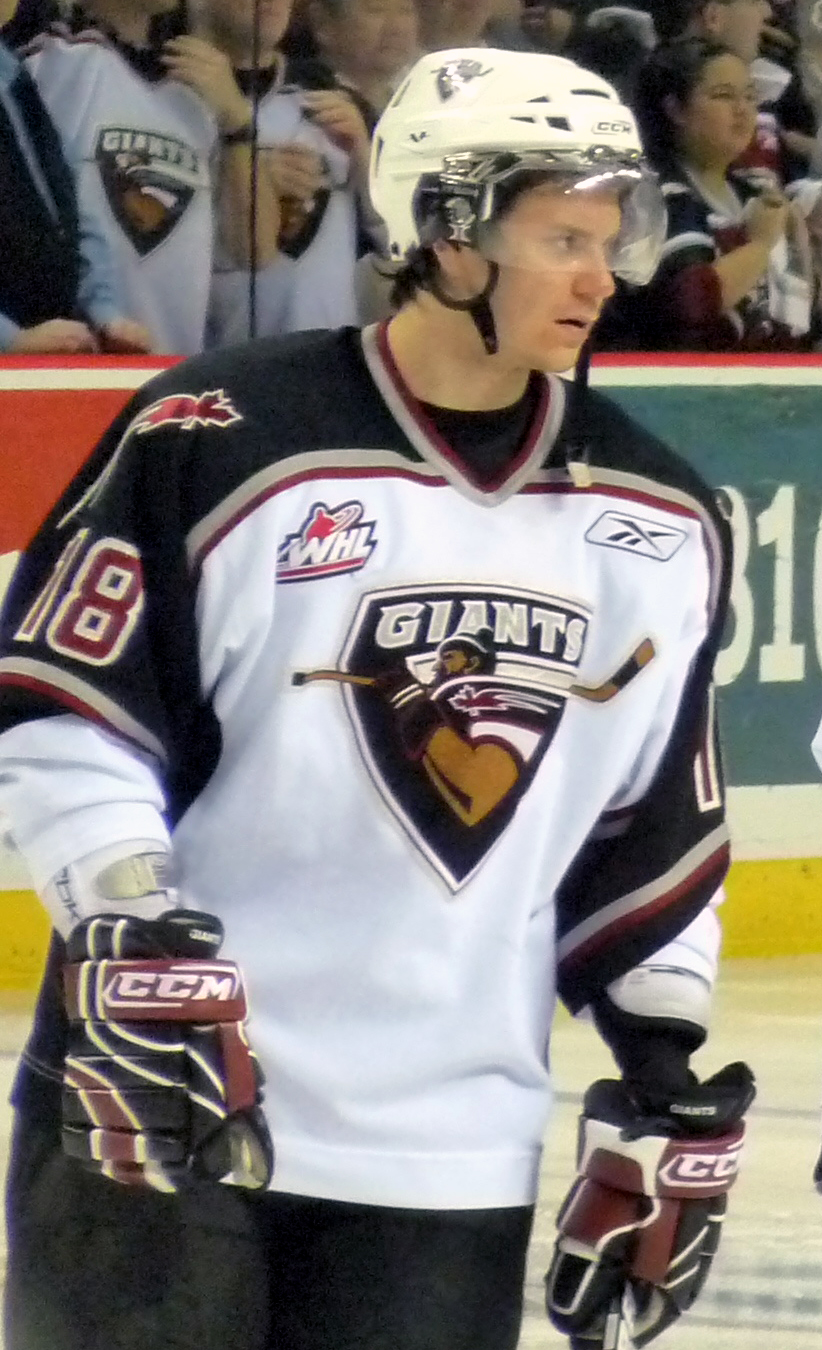
- Fiensko with the Vancouver Giants in 2009
- Born: June 1, 1990 (age 36) Magnitogorsk, Russian SFSR, Soviet Union
- Height: 6 ft 1 in (185 cm)
- Weight: 207 lb (94 kg; 14 st 11 lb)
- Position: Centre
- Shot: Left
- Played for: Metallurg Novokuznetsk; Sibir Novosibirsk; Amur Khabarovsk; Admiral Vladivostok; Avangard Omsk; Ak Bars Kazan; Dynamo Moscow; Metallurg Magnitogorsk; Lada Togliatti
- NHL draft: Undrafted
- Playing career: 2011–2026

Mikhail Fisenko (Russian: Михаил Фисенко) (born June 1, 1990) is a Russian former professional ice hockey player who played as a centre in the Kontinental Hockey League (KHL).

== Playing career ==
Fisenko spent two seasons in North American major junior hockey, suiting up for the Vancouver Giants and Calgary Hitmen of the Western Hockey League (WHL). He later made his KHL debut with Metallurg Novokuznetsk in the 2011–12 KHL season.

After the 2016–17 season concluded, Fisenko was dealt by Admiral Vladivostok to Avangard Omsk on May 8, 2017, in a trade that saw Tigran Manukyan and defenceman Ivan Mishchenko move the other way.

After spending two productive seasons with Avangard Omsk, Fisenko opted to test free agency. On May 16, 2019, he secured a new opportunity by signing a contract with Ak Bars Kazan.

Fisenko played two seasons with Ak Bars Kazan, where he served as a dependable forward, contributing both offensively and defensively while helping the team remain competitive in the Kontinental Hockey League (KHL). Following the conclusion of the 2020–21 season and the expiration of his contract, Fisenko entered free agency. On May 19, 2021, he signed a two-year contract with HC Dynamo Moscow.

Following a single season with Dynamo, Fisenko chose to depart Moscow before the 2022–23 season and signed a one-year deal with Metallurg Magnitogorsk, marking his eighth KHL team, on August 31, 2022.

After his contract with Metallurg Magnitogorsk ended, Fisenko extended his career by agreeing to a one-year deal with the newly reestablished HC Lada Togliatti on 23 June 2023.

Fisenko was tenured with Togliatti for two seasons before returning to former club Ak Bars Kazan on a one-year contract on 4 July 2025 for the 2025–26 season. Fisenko posted 15 points through 53 regular season games and helped Ak Bars to the Gagarin Cup finals before announcing his retirement at the conclusion of the season on 22 May 2026.

== Career statistics ==
=== Regular season and playoffs ===
			Regular season					Playoffs
Season	Team	League	GP	G	A	Pts	PIM	GP	G	A	Pts	PIM
2008–09	Vancouver Giants	WHL	60	12	16	28	50	15	1	3	4	6
2009–10	Calgary Hitmen	WHL	55	12	31	43	29	23	8	11	19	18
2010–11	Calgary Hitmen	WHL	64	8	32	40	55	—	—	—	—	—
2011–12	Metallurg Novokuznetsk	KHL	27	1	2	3	16	—	—	—	—	—
2011–12	Yermak Angarsk	VHL	13	1	5	6	60	2	0	0	0	0
2011–12	Kuznetskie Medvedie	MHL	3	1	1	2	25	7	1	5	6	4
2012–13	Sibir Novosibirsk	KHL	12	1	2	3	4	—	—	—	—	—
2012–13	Amur Khabarovsk	KHL	30	3	6	9	22	—	—	—	—	—
2013–14	Amur Khabarovsk	KHL	25	1	5	6	27	—	—	—	—	—
2014–15	Amur Khabarovsk	KHL	59	11	10	21	76	—	—	—	—	—
2015–16	Admiral Vladivostok	KHL	57	7	13	20	77	3	0	0	0	0
2016–17	Admiral Vladivostok	KHL	32	6	5	11	31	6	0	1	1	29
2017–18	Avangard Omsk	KHL	39	3	6	9	30	5	1	0	1	0
2018–19	Avangard Omsk	KHL	53	4	4	8	30	18	0	4	4	15
2019–20	Ak Bars Kazan	KHL	40	7	6	13	16	4	0	2	2	4
2020–21	Ak Bars Kazan	KHL	40	2	2	4	60	8	0	1	1	2
2021–22	Dynamo Moscow	KHL	28	3	4	7	18	11	1	2	3	18
2022–23	Metallurg Magnitogorsk	KHL	49	3	8	11	38	11	0	1	1	8
2023–24	Lada Togliatti	KHL	58	3	12	15	44	5	0	0	0	2
2024–25	Lada Togliatti	KHL	59	7	8	15	53	—	—	—	—	—
2025–26	Ak Bars Kazan	KHL	53	6	9	15	55	19	0	3	3	17
KHL totals			661	68	102	170	597	90	2	14	16	95

=== International ===
Year	Team	Event	Result	GP	G	A	Pts	PIM
2007	Russia	IH18	3rd place, bronze medalist(s)	4	0	1	1	2
2008	Russia	WJC18	2nd place, silver medalist(s)	6	0	2	2	2
Junior totals				10	0	3	3	4
