= Mark Isherwood (ice hockey) =

Canadian ice hockey player

- Born: January 31, 1989 (age 37) Abbotsford, British Columbia, Canada
- Height: 6 ft 0 in (183 cm)
- Weight: 181 lb (82 kg; 12 st 13 lb)
- Position: Defence
- Shot: Right
- Played for: AHL; Hamilton Bulldogs; ECHL San Francisco Bulls; Alaska Aces; Utah Grizzlies
- NHL draft: Undrafted
- Playing career: 2010–2014

Mark Isherwood (born January 31, 1989) is a Canadian retired ice hockey defenceman.

== Career ==
Isherwood played four seasons (2006–2010) of major junior hockey with the Medicine Hat Tigers of the Western Hockey League, scoring 128 points and registering 353 penalty minutes in 268 games played.

During his rookie 2010–11 ECHL season with the Alaska Aces, Isherwood was a member of the Kelly Cup championship team, and he led all ECHL defensemen with 15 goals and 11 power-play goals. He was recognized for his outstanding play by being named to the ECHL All-Rookie Team.

== Career statistics ==
			Regular season					Playoffs
Season	Team	League	GP	G	A	Pts	PIM	GP	G	A	Pts	PIM
2005–06	Medicine Hat Tigers	WHL	12	1	0	1	6	—	—	—	—	—
2005–06	Abbotsford Pilots	PIJHL	22	7	19	26	168	—	—	—	—	—
2006–07	Coquitlam Express	BCHL	12	3	5	8	42	—	—	—	—	—
2006–07	Medicine Hat Tigers	WHL	44	0	3	3	27	—	—	—	—	—
2007–08	Medicine Hat Tigers	WHL	71	7	28	35	109	5	1	2	3	2
2008–09	Medicine Hat Tigers	WHL	72	19	23	42	95	11	0	8	8	17
2009–10	Medicine Hat Tigers	WHL	69	17	30	47	116	12	2	2	4	20
2010–11	Alaska Aces	ECHL	70	15	20	35	61	11	2	4	6	8
2012–13	Utah Grizzlies	ECHL	37	5	12	17	59	—	—	—	—	—
2012–13	San Francisco Bulls	ECHL	13	1	2	3	32	5	0	1	1	4
2012–13	Hamilton Bulldogs	AHL	2	0	0	0	0	—	—	—	—	—
2013–14	Ducs d'Angers	France	14	1	2	3	8	—	—	—	—	—
2013–14	Arizona Sundogs	CHL	34	3	6	9	12	10	0	2	2	8
ECHL totals			120	21	34	55	152	16	2	5	7	12

== Awards and honours ==
Award	Year
ECHL All-Rookie Team	2010–11
