= Dustin Sylvester =

Canadian ice hockey player (born 1989)

- Born: January 5, 1989 (age 37) Kelowna, British Columbia, Canada
- Height: 5 ft 6 in (168 cm)
- Weight: 165 lb (75 kg; 11 st 11 lb)
- Position: Centre
- Shot: Left
- Played for: Lake Erie Monsters; EHC Freiburg; Abbotsford Heat; Vienna Capitals; Dornbirner EC; EC Bad Nauheim
- NHL draft: Undrafted
- Playing career: 2010–2019

Dustin Sylvester (born January 5, 1989) is a Canadian former professional ice hockey player who last played with EC Bad Nauheim of the DEL2.

== Playing career ==
Prior to turning professional and undrafted, Sylvester played major junior hockey in the Western Hockey League with the Kootenay Ice. In his final season with the Blades in 2009–10, Sylvester scored 35 goals and 93 points in 68 games, before signing an amateur try-out contract with the Lake Erie Monsters in which he appeared in three American Hockey League games.

Slyvester signed a one-year contract in the German 2nd Bundesliga with EHC Freiburg on July 7, 2010. In the 2010–11 season, he led the league with 34 goals in only 48 games. On September 15, 2011, he returned to North America and signed an AHL contract with the Abbotsford Heat of the AHL.

During the 2011–12 season, Sylvester established himself on the second offensive line with the Heat, contributing with 34 points in 65 games to earn a one-year contract extension on July 3, 2012.

On June 19, 2013, Sylvester signed as a free agent for a second time in Europe with top Austrian league club, the Vienna Capitals on a one-year contract.

== Career statistics ==
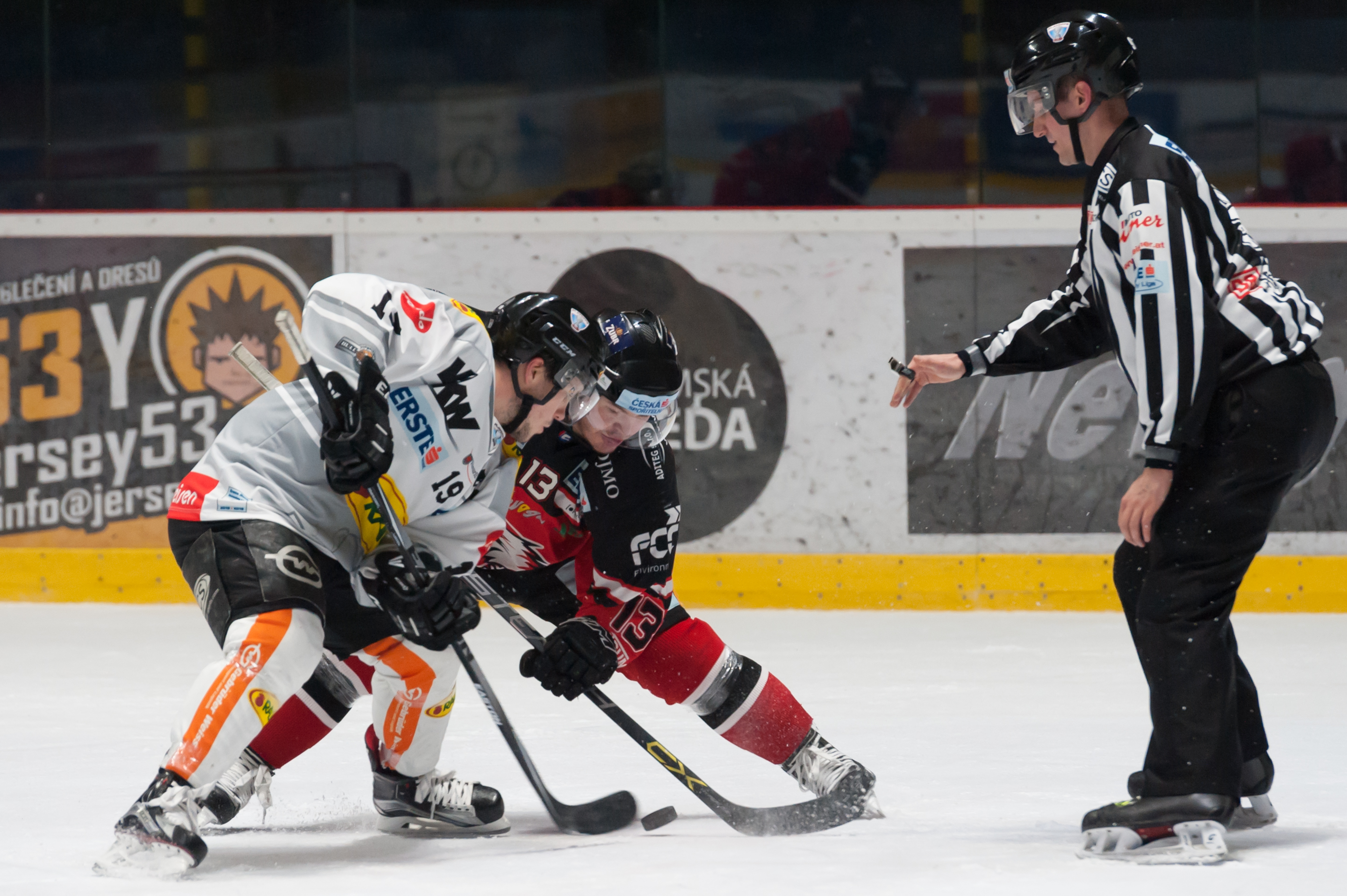
Sylvester taking a faceoff for Dornbirner EC against Colton Yellow Horn on March 6, 2016.

=== Regular season and playoffs ===
			Regular season					Playoffs
Season	Team	League	GP	G	A	Pts	PIM	GP	G	A	Pts	PIM
2004–05	Kootenay Ice	WHL	6	1	1	2	2	—	—	—	—	—
2005–06	Kootenay Ice	WHL	58	2	4	6	13	6	0	0	0	0
2006–07	Kootenay Ice	WHL	72	17	25	42	53	7	2	0	2	6
2007–08	Kootenay Ice	WHL	70	35	33	68	38	10	2	10	12	4
2008–09	Kootenay Ice	WHL	34	21	20	41	29	—	—	—	—	—
2009–10	Kootenay Ice	WHL	68	35	58	93	41	6	1	1	2	8
2009–10	Lake Erie Monsters	AHL	3	0	0	0	0	—	—	—	—	—
2010–11	EHC Freiburg	2.GBun	48	34	26	60	83	—	—	—	—	—
2011–12	Abbotsford Heat	AHL	64	15	19	34	20	8	3	1	4	6
2012–13	Abbotsford Heat	AHL	62	11	12	23	10	—	—	—	—	—
2013–14	Vienna Capitals	EBEL	50	18	16	34	42	—	—	—	—	—
2014–15	Vienna Capitals	EBEL	48	10	7	17	10	10	2	1	3	4
2015–16	Dornbirner EC	EBEL	51	14	14	28	26	6	0	2	2	16
2016–17	Dornbirner EC	EBEL	46	14	22	36	28	—	—	—	—	—
2017–18	Dornbirner EC	EBEL	54	18	26	44	18	6	1	0	1	2
AHL totals			119	26	31	57	30	8	3	1	4	6

=== International ===
Year	Team	Event	Result	GP	G	A	Pts	PIM
2006	Canada Pacific	U17	4th	6	5	4	9	16
Junior totals				6	5	4	9	16

== Awards and honours ==
Award	Year
WHL
East Second All-Star Team	2010
2.GBun
Most Goals scored (34)	2011
