= Alexander Viklund =

Swedish ice hockey player

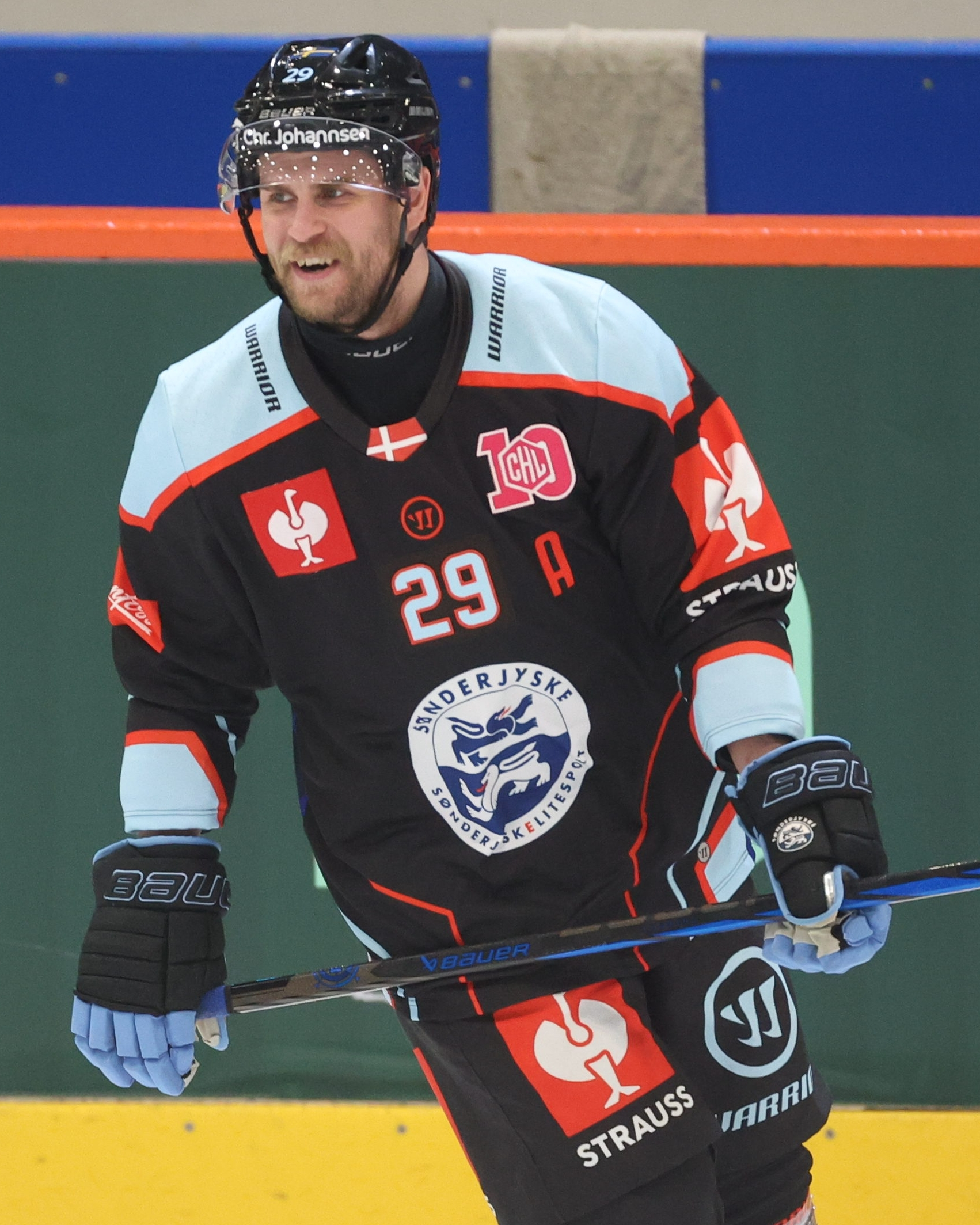
- Alexander Viklund, 2024
- Born: December 28, 1990 (age 34); Piteå, Sweden
- Height: 6 ft 0 in (183 cm)
- Weight: 190 lb (86 kg; 13 st 8 lb)
- Position: Forward
- Shoots: Left
- team Former teams: Free agent Karlskrona HK; SønderjyskE
- NHL draft: Undrafted
- Playing career: 2008–present

Alexander Viklund (born December 28, 1990) is a Swedish professional ice hockey player. He is currently an unrestricted free agent. He most recently playing with SønderjyskE of the Metal Ligaen (Metal).

Viklund made his HockeyAllsvenskan debut playing with BIK Karlskoga during the 2010–11 HockeyAllsvenskan season. He later made his top tiered Swedish Hockey League debut with Karlskrona HK in the 2015–16 season.
