= Sergei Drozd =

Belarusian ice hockey player

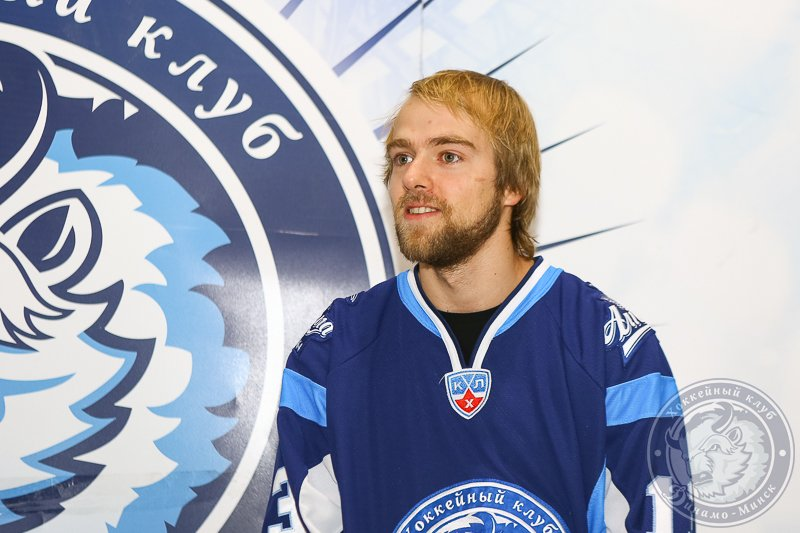
- Born: 14 April 1990 (age 36) Minsk, Byelorussian SSR, Soviet Union
- Height: 6 ft 0 in (183 cm)
- Weight: 181 lb (82 kg; 12 st 13 lb)
- Position: Right wing
- Shoots: Left
- BXL team Former teams: Yunost Minsk; Shinnik Bobruisk; Keramin Minsk; HC Dinamo Minsk; HK Neman Grodno
- National team: Belarus
- NHL draft: Undrafted
- Playing career: 2008–present

Sergei Nikolaevich Drozd (Belarusian: Сяргей Мікалаевіч Дрозд, Russian: Сергей Николаевич Дрозд; born 14 April 1990) is a Belarusian professional ice hockey player who participated at the 2010 IIHF World Championship as a member of the Belarus National men's ice hockey team. He currently plays for Yunost Minsk in the Belarusian Extraliga (BXL). He has formerly played for HC Dinamo Minsk in the Kontinental Hockey League (KHL).
