= James Henry (ice hockey) =

Canadian ice hockey player (born 1991)

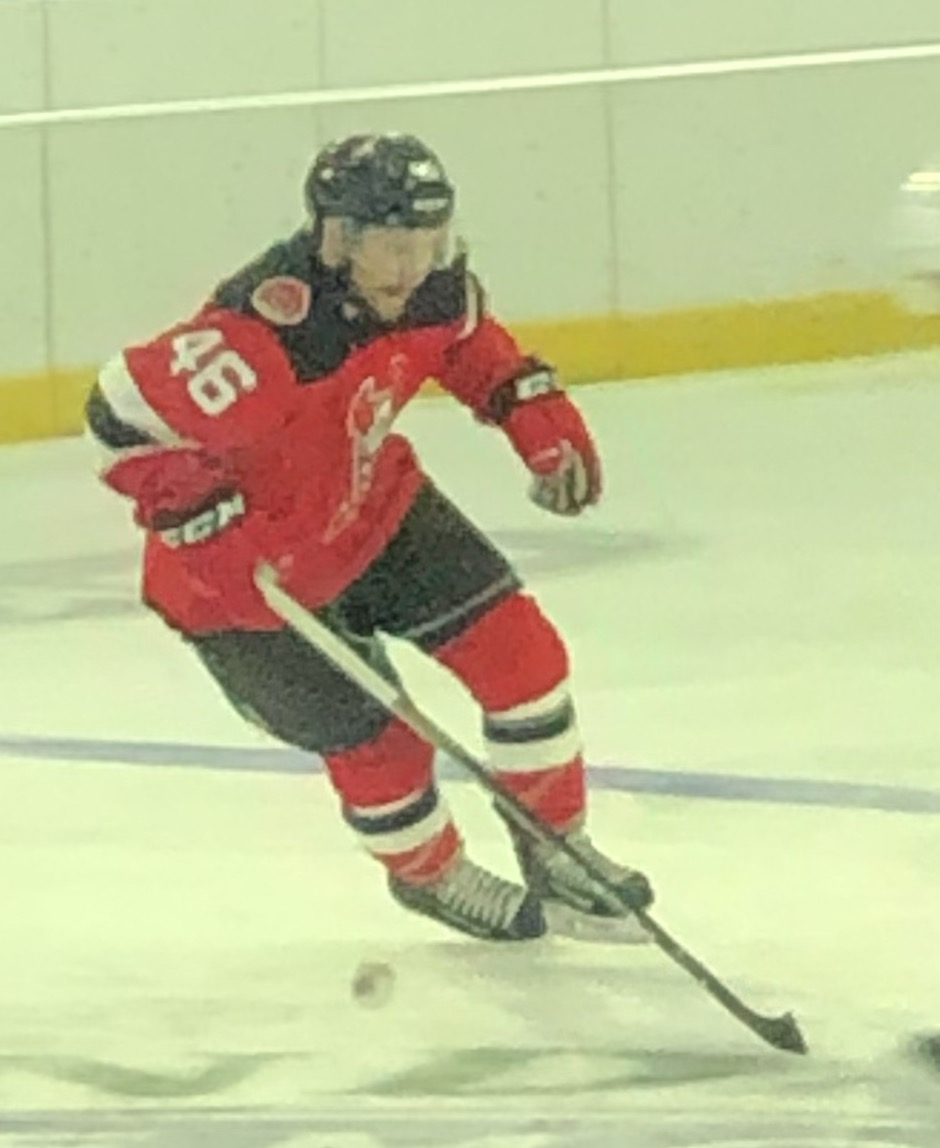
- Henry with Binghamton Devils in 2019
- Born: March 11, 1991 (age 35) Winnipeg, Manitoba, Canada
- Height: 5 ft 9 in (175 cm)
- Weight: 180 lb (82 kg; 12 st 12 lb)
- Position: Left wing
- Shot: Left
- Played for: Adirondack Thunder
- NHL draft: Undrafted
- Playing career: 2013–2020
- Coaching career: 2020–present

James Henry (born March 11, 1991) is a Canadian former ice hockey left winger. He previously served as head coach of the Reading Royals (ECHL) and as the captain for the Adirondack Thunder of the ECHL. He is currently the general manager of the Connecticut RoughRiders® and the Syracuse Lightning of the National Collegiate Development Conference (NCDC) for the 2026–27 season.

== Playing career ==
=== Junior ===
Henry was selected into the Western Hockey League (WHL) 187th overall by the Vancouver Giants in the 2006 WHL Bantam Draft. He began his major junior career with the Giants in 2007-08, recording 15 points in 46 games played. That same year, he was selected by Canada Western U17 (WHC-17), recording 3 points and winning a bronze medal. He finished his career in Vancouver as the Giants' Captain in 2012 before being traded to the Moose Jaw Warriors of the WHL, where he recorded 30 points in 28 games played. Currently, Henry is the Vancouver Giants' single season short-handed goals leader with 6 (from the 2009-10 campaign), ranks 5th in games played with 281 (2006–12), and ranks 5th in penalty minutes with 57 (2006–12). Notably, on March 20, 2010, the Giants and Kamloops Blazers combined for the fastest three goals in WHL playoff history. Craig Cunningham scored at 3:58 of the 3rd period for Vancouver, James Henry scored at 4:14 for Vancouver, and Dalibor Bortnak scored at 4:21 for Kamloops. The Giants won 6-3.

He had a short stint with the University of Manitoba of the CIS in 2012-13 (Canadian Interuniversity Sport), where he was awarded the CIS (West) Most Outstanding Freshman (University of Alberta Hockey Alumni Trophy) and was named to the CIS All-Rookie Team.

=== Professional ===
Henry spent two seasons with the Stockton Thunder of the ECHL (2013–15); Henry followed the organization when it moved to Glens Falls, NY, for the 2016 season. Henry played for the Adirondack Thunder of the ECHL for 5 seasons, serving as the team's Captain from 2018–20, where he is the franchise's all-time points, assists, games played, single-season assists, and single-season points leader. Henry was invited to the 2016-17 ECHL All-Star Game and received the ECHL Community Service Award 2018-19.

In April 2022, Henry was inducted into the Adirondack Hockey Hall of Fame's 2022 Class alongside Claude Loiselle, and Mike Kane.

== Coaching career ==
In the summer of 2021, Henry was named as the first head coach of the Binghamton Black Bears of the Federal Professional Hockey League before resigning to accept a position as the Reading Royals assistant coach.

Henry served as the Reading Royals assistant coach under head coach Kirk Macdonald 2021–22. In 2022, MacDonald left his position and Henry was promoted to the head coach and director of hockey operations for the 2022–23 season.

Henry's introductory season as head coach concluded with a second-round exit from playoffs; the team finished the regular season 2nd in the North division. After a successful first season, Henry and the Royals parted ways on January 29th, 2024. The Royals were 5 points out of a playoff spot at the time.

On April 7th, 2024, Team Maryland announced they hired Henry as the U16 Head Coach and Midget Director. In addition to those duties, he is a scout for the Black Bear Sports Group (BBSG) owned Youngstown Phantoms (USHL).

== Personal ==
Henry and his wife, Ashley, live in the Reading, PA area with their children, Tillie and Jordy.
