= 2008–09 WHL season =

- League: Western Hockey League
- Sport: Ice hockey
- Duration: Regular season September 18, 2008 – March 17, 2009; Playoffs; March 20 – May 9, 2009
- Teams: 22
- TV partner: Shaw TV

Regular season
- Scotty Munro Memorial Trophy: Calgary Hitmen (3)
- Season MVP: Brett Sonne (Calgary Hitmen)
- Top scorer: Casey Pierro-Zabotel (Vancouver Giants)

Playoffs
- Playoffs MVP: Tyler Myers (Rockets)
- Finals champions: Kelowna Rockets (3)
- Runners-up: Calgary Hitmen

WHL seasons
- 2007–08 2009–10

2008–09 CHL season
- League: Canadian Hockey League
- Sport: Ice hockey
- Duration: OHL; 2008-09-17 – 2009-03-15; QMJHL; 2008-09-11 – 2009-03-15; WHL; 2008-09-18 – 2009-03-15
- Teams: 60
- TV partner(s): RDS, Rogers Sportsnet, Rogers TV, Shaw TV
- Season MVP: Cody Hodgson (Brampton Battalion)
- Top scorer: Yannick Riendeau (Drummondville Voltigeurs)

Memorial Cup
- Finals champions: Windsor Spitfires (OHL) (1st title)
- Runners-up: Kelowna Rockets (WHL)

The 2008–09 WHL season was the 43rd season of the Western Hockey League (WHL). The regular season began on September 18, 2008, and ended on March 15, 2009. The 2008 ADT Canada Russia Challenge series, featuring Team WHL versus the Russian Selects, took place mid-season from November 26 to 27, 2008. The Calgary Hitmen won the Scotty Munro Memorial Trophy with the best regular season record. The playoffs commenced on March 20, and concluded on May 9. The Kelowna Rockets won the Ed Chynoweth Cup as WHL champions, defeating the Hitmen in the championship series and earning a berth at the 2009 Memorial Cup tournament.

WHL Commissioner, Ron Robison, dedicated the 2008–09 season to Ed Chynoweth.

== 2008–09: Ed Chynoweth's season ==
The 2008–09 WHL Season will allow us to showcase some of the finest young hockey talent in the world today.
We fully expect each WHL Division will feature highly competitive races as our clubs battle for a playoff position.

— Ron Robison, WHL Commissioner

WHL Commissioner Ron Robison dedicated the 2008–09 season to long-time league president Ed Chynoweth, who died on April 22, 2008. His death occurred just over a year after the WHL Championship trophy was renamed in his honour. Throughout the 2008–09 season, the helmets of all the players and officials displayed a commemorative decal.

=== League notes ===
Off-season

- June 17, 2008 — Ed Chynoweth was elected to the Hockey Hall of Fame.
- June 20–21, 2008 — 37 WHL players were selected in the 2008 NHL entry draft.
- June 24, 2008 — 16 WHL players were invited to the National Men's Under-18 Selection Camp.
- June 25, 2008 — 17 WHL players were invited to the Hockey Canada's National Junior Team Development Camp.
- June 26, 2008 — The WHL entered into a partnership with Hockey Manitoba, providing additional financial support for their hockey system.
- July 7, 2008 — Saskatoon and Regina were chosen as hosts to the 2010 IIHF World Junior Championship.
- July 23, 2008 — 18 WHL players attended Canada's National Junior Team Development Camp in Ottawa, Ontario.
- July 30, 2008 — Brandon Wheat Kings athletic trainer Rob "Stofe" Stouffer died of liver cancer.
- August 5, 2008 — 10 WHL players were named to Canada's Under-18 Summer Team at the 2008 Ivan Hlinka Memorial Tournament.
- August 7, 2008 — 6 WHL players were invited to the 2008 U.S. National Junior Evaluation Camp in Lake Placid, New York.
- August 16, 2008 — Canada's National Men's Summer Under-18 Team claimed first place at the 2008 Ivan Hlinka tournament, with a 6–3 win over Russia.

Regular season

- September 18, 2008 — A tribute involving members of the Chynoweth family took place prior to the season opener between the Spokane Chiefs and Kootenay Ice.
- October 15, 2008 — The 2010 Memorial Cup was awarded to Brandon.
- January 3, 2009 — The Seattle Thunderbirds moved into their new arena, Showare Center, in Kent, Washington.
- January 14, 2009 — The 2009 CHL Top Prospects Game was held in Oshawa, Ontario.

== Regular season ==
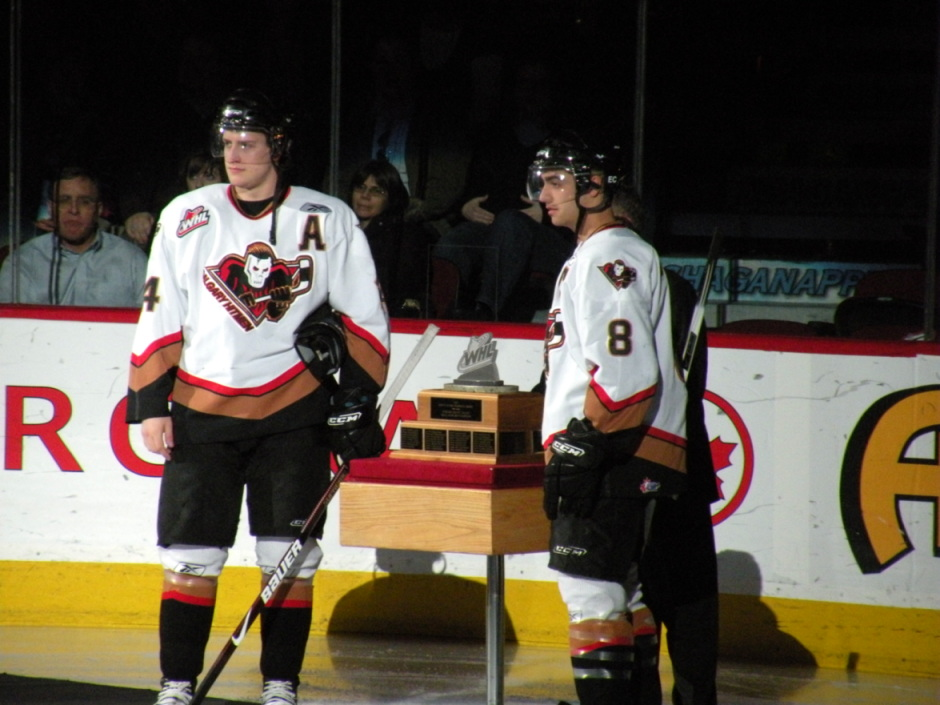
Calgary Hitmen forwards Carson McMillan and Kyle Bortis accept the Scotty Munro Memorial Trophy as the 2008–09 regular season champions.

=== Standings ===
Map of WHL, 2007–08 to 2010–11
East Division
Central Division
BC Division
US Division

Divisions

East Division
Pos	Team	Pld	W	L	OTL	SOL	GF	GA	Pts
1	Saskatoon Blades	72	49	18	3	2	283	195	103
2	Brandon Wheat Kings	72	48	19	3	2	295	220	101
3	Swift Current Broncos	72	42	28	1	1	258	220	86
4	Prince Albert Raiders	72	31	36	4	1	233	270	67
5	Regina Pats	72	27	39	1	5	228	265	60
6	Moose Jaw Warriors	72	19	50	1	2	198	352	41

Central Division
Pos	Team	Pld	W	L	OTL	SOL	GF	GA	Pts
1	Calgary Hitmen	72	59	9	3	1	330	159	122
2	Medicine Hat Tigers	72	36	29	4	3	249	242	79
3	Kootenay Ice	72	35	29	2	6	220	224	78
4	Lethbridge Hurricanes	72	35	32	3	2	227	228	75
5	Edmonton Oil Kings	72	29	34	4	5	191	252	67
6	Red Deer Rebels	72	25	37	1	9	172	250	60

B.C. Division
Pos	Team	Pld	W	L	OTL	SOL	GF	GA	Pts
1	Vancouver Giants	72	57	10	2	3	319	151	119
2	Kelowna Rockets	72	47	21	1	3	267	178	98
3	Kamloops Blazers	72	33	33	2	4	242	277	72
4	Prince George Cougars	72	25	44	0	3	188	298	53
5	Chilliwack Bruins	72	19	46	2	5	154	267	45

U.S. Division
Pos	Team	Pld	W	L	OTL	SOL	GF	GA	Pts
1	Tri-City Americans	72	49	20	0	3	263	184	101
2	Spokane Chiefs	72	46	23	0	3	244	145	95
3	Seattle Thunderbirds	72	35	32	1	4	222	234	75
4	Everett Silvertips	72	27	36	7	2	199	259	63
5	Portland Winter Hawks	72	19	48	3	2	176	288	43

Conference standings

Eastern Conference
Pos	Team	Pld	W	L	OTL	SOL	GF	GA	Pts
1	z – Calgary Hitmen	72	59	9	3	1	330	159	122
2	x – Saskatoon Blades	72	49	18	3	2	283	195	103
3	x – Brandon Wheat Kings	72	48	19	3	2	295	220	101
4	x – Swift Current Broncos	72	42	28	1	1	258	220	86
5	x – Medicine Hat Tigers	72	36	29	4	3	249	242	79
6	x – Kootenay Ice	72	35	29	2	6	220	224	78
7	x – Lethbridge Hurricanes	72	35	32	3	2	227	228	75
8	x – Edmonton Oil Kings	72	29	34	4	5	191	252	67
9	Prince Albert Raiders	72	31	36	4	1	233	270	67
10	Regina Pats	72	27	39	1	5	228	265	60
11	Red Deer Rebels	72	25	37	1	9	172	250	60
12	Moose Jaw Warriors	72	19	50	1	2	198	352	41

x – clinched playoff spot; z – clinched best conference record

Western Conference
Pos	Team	Pld	W	L	OTL	SOL	GF	GA	Pts
1	x – Vancouver Giants	72	57	10	2	3	319	151	119
2	x – Tri-City Americans	72	49	20	0	3	263	184	101
3	x – Kelowna Rockets	72	47	21	1	3	267	178	98
4	x – Spokane Chiefs	72	46	23	0	3	244	145	95
5	x – Seattle Thunderbirds	72	35	32	1	4	222	234	75
6	x – Kamloops Blazers	72	33	33	2	4	242	277	72
7	x – Everett Silvertips	72	27	36	7	2	199	259	63
8	x – Prince George Cougars	72	25	44	0	3	188	298	53
9	Chilliwack Bruins	72	19	46	2	5	154	267	45
10	Portland Winter Hawks	72	19	48	3	2	176	288	43

x – clinched playoff spot

== Eastern Conference Tiebreaker ==
=== Prince Albert Raiders vs. Edmonton Oil Kings ===
March 22	Prince Albert Raiders	1 – 2	OT	Edmonton Oil Kings
No scoring		First period		9:24 - pp - Brent Raedeke (1)
Bryce Lamb (1) - 10:46		Second period		No scoring
No scoring		Third period		No scoring
No scoring		First overtime period		10:46 - Rhett Rachinski (1)
Garrett Zemlak (40 saves / 42 shots)		Goalie stats		Torrie Jung (35 saves / 36 shots)

Edmonton claims final playoff spot

== Scoring leaders ==
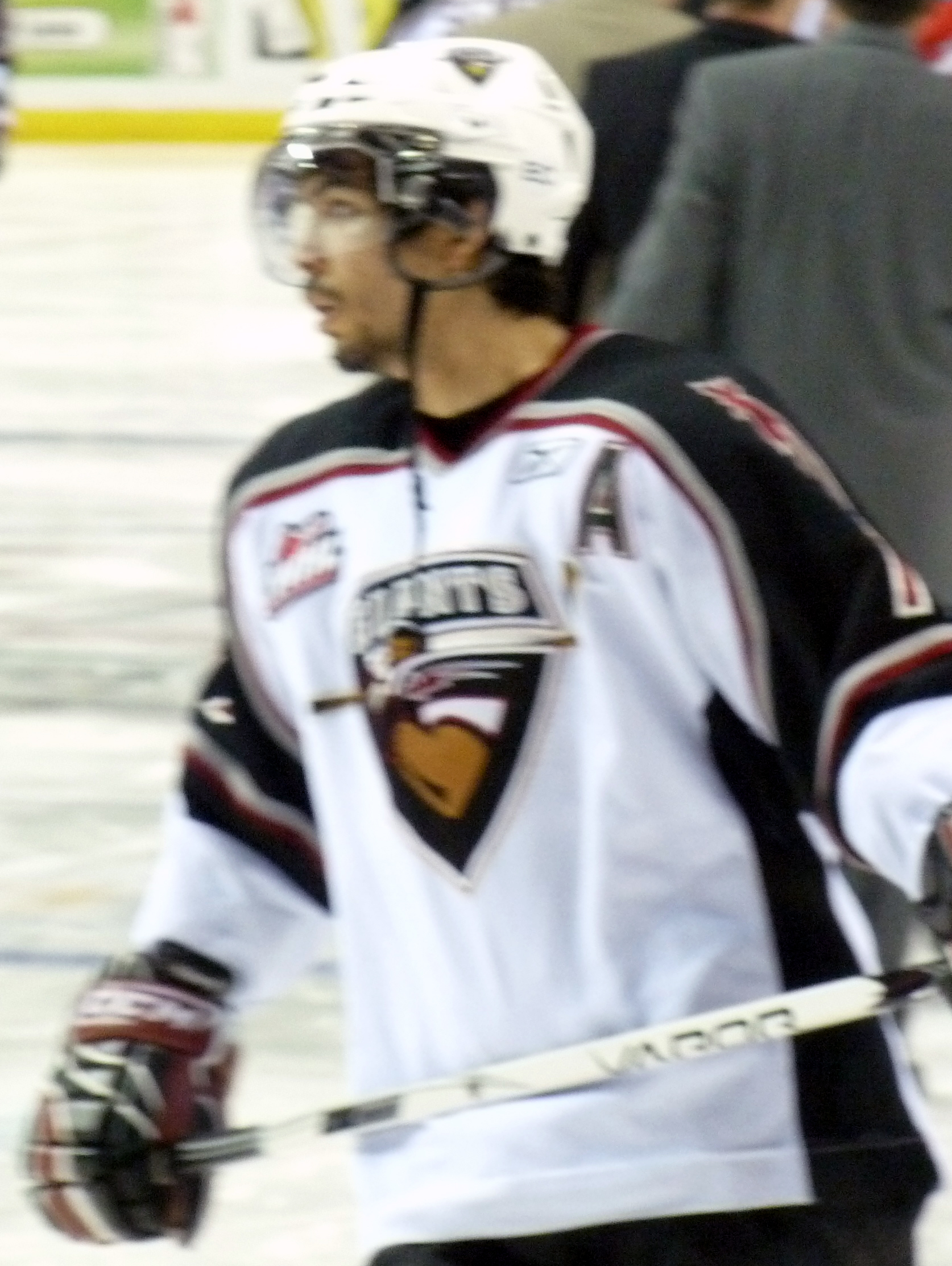
Casey Pierro-Zabotel led the league in scoring with 115 points

Note: GP = Games played; G = Goals; A = Assists; Pts. = Points; PIM = Penalty minutes

Player	Team	GP	G	A	Pts.	PIM
Casey Pierro-Zabotel	Vancouver Giants	72	36	79	115	52
Brandon Kozun	Calgary Hitmen	72	40	68	108	58
Brett Sonne	Calgary Hitmen	62	48	52	100	58
Evander Kane	Vancouver Giants	61	48	48	96	89
Justin Bernhardt	Prince Albert Raiders	72	35	57	92	104
Colin Long	Kelowna Rockets	68	33	58	91	28
Brayden Schenn	Brandon Wheat Kings	70	32	56	88	82
Joel Broda	Calgary Hitmen	67	53	34	87	64
C. J. Stretch	Kamloops Blazers	72	29	57	86	72
Tyler Ennis	Medicine Hat Tigers	61	43	42	85	21

== Leading goaltenders ==
Note: GP = Games played; Mins = Minutes played; W = Wins; L = Losses; OTL = Overtime losses; SOL = Shootout Losses; SO = Shutouts; GAA = Goals against average; Sv% = Save percentage

Player	Team	GP	Mins	W	L	OTL	SOL	SO	GAA	SV%
Dustin Tokarski	Spokane Chiefs	54	3264	34	18	0	2	7	1.97	.937
Adam Brown	Kelowna Rockets	29	1514	18	5	0	1	2	2.02	.912
Martin Jones	Calgary Hitmen	55	3295	45	5	3	1	7	2.08	.915
Tyson Sexsmith	Vancouver Giants	52	3109	39	9	2	2	6	2.26	.898
Chet Pickard	Tri-City Americans	50	2947	35	12	0	3	6	2.28	.921

== Players ==
=== 2008 NHL entry draft ===
37 WHL players were selected at the 2008 NHL entry draft. This was more than any other hockey league in the world.

2008 NHL Entry Draft (WHL draftees)

1st round
#	Nat.	Player	Age	WHL team	NHL team
5	(Canada)	Luke Schenn	18	Kelowna Rockets	Toronto Maple Leafs
11	(Canada)	Kyle Beach	18	Everett Silvertips	Chicago Blackhawks
12	(Canada)	Tyler Myers	18	Kelowna Rockets	Buffalo Sabres
13	(Canada)	Colten Teubert	18	Regina Pats	Los Angeles Kings
14	(Canada)	Zach Boychuk	18	Lethbridge Hurricanes	Carolina Hurricanes
18	(Canada)	Chet Pickard	18	Tri-City Americans	Nashville Predators
19	(Switzerland)	Luca Sbisa	18	Lethbridge Hurricanes	Philadelphia Flyers
22	(Canada)	Jordan Eberle	18	Regina Pats	Edmonton Oilers
26	(Canada)	Tyler Ennis	18	Medicine Hat Tigers	Buffalo Sabres

2nd round
#	Nat.	Player	Age	WHL team	NHL team
46	(Canada)	Colby Robak	18	Brandon Wheat Kings	Florida Panthers
48	(United States)	Mitch Wahl	18	Spokane Chiefs	Calgary Flames
53	(Canada)	Travis Hamonic	18	Moose Jaw Warriors	New York Islanders
57	(Canada)	Eric Mestery	18	Tri-City Americans	Washington Capitals

3rd round
#	Nat.	Player	Age	WHL team	NHL team
69	(Canada)	Michael Stone	18	Calgary Hitmen	Phoenix Coyotes
72	(Finland)	Jyri Niemi	18	Saskatoon Blades	New York Islanders
78	(Canada)	Lance Bouma	18	Vancouver Giants	Calgary Flames
79	(Canada)	Zack Smith	20	Swift Current Broncos	Ottawa Senators
84	(Canada)	Jacob DeSerres	18	Seattle Thunderbirds	Philadelphia Flyers
85	(Canada)	Brandon McMillan	18	Kelowna Rockets	Anaheim Ducks
87	(Canada)	Ian Schultz	18	Calgary Hitmen	St. Louis Blues
88	(Canada)	Geordie Wudrick	18	Swift Current Broncos	Los Angeles Kings

4th round
#	Nat.	Player	Age	WHL team	NHL team
93	(Canada)	Braden Holtby	18	Saskatoon Blades	Washington Capitals
99	(United States)	Colin Long	18	Kelowna Rockets	Phoenix Coyotes
111	(Canada)	Dale Weise	18	Swift Current Broncos	New York Rangers
112	(Canada)	Matt Delahey	18	Regina Pats	New Jersey Devils
117	(Canada)	James Wright	18	Vancouver Giants	Tampa Bay Lightning

5th round
#	Nat.	Player	Age	WHL team	NHL team
122	(Canada)	Dustin Tokarski	18	Spokane Chiefs	Tampa Bay Lightning
127	(Canada)	Matt Calvert	18	Brandon Wheat Kings	Columbus Blue Jackets
131	(Canada)	Prab Rai	18	Seattle Thunderbirds	Vancouver Canucks
132	(Canada)	Teigan Zahn	18	Saskatoon Blades	Chicago Blackhawks
137	(Canada)	Brent Regner	18	Vancouver Giants	Columbus Blue Jackets
144	(Canada)	Joel Broda	18	Moose Jaw Warriors	Washington Capitals

6th round
#	Nat.	Player	Age	WHL team	NHL team
156	(Canada)	Jared Spurgeon	18	Spokane Chiefs	New York Islanders
168	(Canada)	Ryley Grantham	18	Moose Jaw Warriors	Calgary Flames
176	(Canada)	Matt Tassone	18	Swift Current Broncos	Dallas Stars

7th round
#	Nat.	Player	Age	WHL team	NHL team
191	(United States)	Morgan Clark	18	Red Deer Rebels	Vancouver Canucks
193	(Canada)	Jordan Bendfeld	18	Medicine Hat Tigers	Edmonton Oilers

=== Contracts and scholarships ===
- June 6, 2008 — Brett Martyniuk signs a WHL Players Contract with the Tri-City Americans.
- June 9, 2008 — Bretton Stamler agrees to play for the UNB Varsity Reds hockey club.

=== Trades ===
Date	Deal made	
June 3, 2008	Red Deer Rebels	Seattle Thunderbirds
June 3, 2008	Mike Krgovich → 5th-round pick →	← Steve Oursov
June 3, 2008	RD trades Krgovich and conditional 5th-round pick in the 2010 WHL Bantam Draft – SEA trades Oursov.	
June 12, 2008	Tri-City Americans	Swift Current Broncos
June 12, 2008	5th-round pick →	← Scott Macauley
June 12, 2008	TC trades conditional 5th-round pick in the 2009 WHL Bantam Draft – SC trades Macauley.	
September 20, 2008	Kootenay Ice	Kelowna Rockets
September 20, 2008	Kris Lazaruk →	← 4th-round pick
September 20, 2008	KTN trades Lazaruk – KEL trades conditional 4th-round pick in the 2010 WHL Bantam Draft.	
September 22, 2008	Tri-City Americans	Moose Jaw Warriors
September 22, 2008	Kyle Birch →	← 5th-round pick
September 22, 2008	TC trades Birch – MJ trades conditional 5th-round pick in the 2011 WHL Bantam Draft.	
September 27, 2008	Lethbridge Hurricanes	Edmonton Oil Kings
September 27, 2008	7th-round pick →	← Brent Henke
September 27, 2008	LET trades 7th-round pick in the 2009 WHL Bantam Draft – EDM trades Henke.	
September 29, 2008	Brandon Wheat Kings	Kamloops Blazers
September 29, 2008	3rd-round pick →	← James Priestner
September 29, 2008	BDN trades 3rd-round pick in the 2009 WHL Bantam Draft – KAM trades Priestner.	

== Canada-Russia Challenge ==
The ADT Canada Russia Challenge was a six-game series featuring four teams: three from the Canadian Hockey League (CHL)—one team from each of the QMJHL, the OHL, and the WHL—versus Russia's national junior hockey team.

The ADT Canada Russia Challenge has become a highlight on the CHL schedule and we are very proud to be associated with it.
These two nations have such a storied hockey history that fans from across the country tune in expecting to see a hard fought series.
We expect nothing short of world class hockey this November that hockey fans from across the country won't want to miss.

— Joe O'Connell, Regional Vice-President of Canada

The 2008 series was held in six cities across Canada. The series begun on November 17, 2008, and concluded on November 27, 2008. Both Western Hockey League games were held in Saskatchewan. Former Prince Albert Raider forward Dan Hodgson was Honorary Captain for the final game in the series, held in Prince Albert on November 27, 2008.

=== Results ===
#	Date	Visitor	Score	Home	Attendance	Location	Recap
1	November 17, 2008	Russian Selects	3–5	Team QMJHL	4,378	Sydney, Nova Scotia
2	November 19, 2008	Russian Selects	4–3	Team QMJHL	6,451	Saint John, New Brunswick
3	November 20, 2008	Russian Selects	6–3	Team OHL	4,751	Guelph, Ontario
4	November 24, 2008	Russian Selects	2–3	Team OHL	3,145	St. Catharines, Ontario
5	November 26, 2008	Russian Selects	0–5	Team WHL	2,800	Swift Current, Saskatchewan
6	November 27, 2008	Russian Selects	1–2	Team WHL	2,749	Prince Albert, Saskatchewan

== 2009 WHL Playoffs ==
=== Overview ===
Conference Quarter-finals	Conference Semi-finals
1	Calgary	4
8	Edmonton	0
1	Calgary	4
7	Lethbridge	0
2	Saskatoon	3
7	Lethbridge	4
Eastern
3	Brandon	4
6	Kootenay	0
3	Brandon	4
5	Medicine Hat	0
4	Swift Current	3
5	Medicine Hat	4
1	Vancouver	4
8	Prince George	0
1	Vancouver	4
4	Spokane	3
4	Spokane	4
5	Seattle	1
Western
2	Tri-City	4
7	Everett	1
2	Tri-City	2
3	Kelowna	4
3	Kelowna	4
6	Kamloops	0

Conference Finals
1	Calgary	4
3	Brandon	0
1	Vancouver	2
3	Kelowna	4

WHL Championship
E1	Calgary	2
W3	Kelowna	4

== Conference Quarter-finals ==
=== (1) Calgary Hitmen vs. (8) Edmonton Oil Kings ===
March 19	Calgary Hitmen	5 – 0	Edmonton Oil Kings	Scotiabank Saddledome
16:35 - pp - Ian Schultz (1)		First period	No scoring
8:19 - Kris Foucault (1); 11:41 - Joel Broda (1); 13:43 - Brandon Kozun (1)		Second period	No scoring
15:43 - pp - Joel Broda (2)		Third period	No scoring
Martin Jones (21 saves / 21 shots)		Goalie stats	Torrie Jung (32 saves / 37 shots)

March 22	Calgary Hitmen	2 – 1	OT	Edmonton Oil Kings	Scotiabank Saddledome
No scoring		First period		No scoring
No scoring		Second period		Shayne Neigum (1) - pp - 7:07
15:42 - Kris Foucault (2)		Third period		No scoring
8:04 - Carson McMillan (1)		First overtime period		No scoring
Martin Jones (24 saves / 25 shots)		Goalie stats		Torrie Jung (54 saves / 56 shots)

March 23	Edmonton Oil Kings	1 – 4	Calgary Hitmen	Rexall Place
No scoring		First period	Alex Plante (1) - 19:59
No scoring		Second period	Joel Broda (3) - 12:44; Brandon Kozun (2) - 16:03
5:33 - pp - Robin Soudek (1)		Third period	Ian Schultz (2) - 15:11
Torrie Jung (41 saves / 45 shots)		Goalie stats	Martin Jones (20 saves / 21 shots)

March 25	Edmonton Oil Kings	1 – 4	Calgary Hitmen	Rexall Place
11:14 - pp - Brent Raedeke (1)		First period	No scoring
No scoring		Second period	Kris Foucault (3) - 1:47; Kris Foucault (4) - 18:22
No scoring		Third period	Kyle Bortis (1) - 7:06; Brandon Kozun (3) - 7:39
Torrie Jung (39 saves / 43 shots)		Goalie stats	Martin Jones (19 saves / 20 shots)

Calgary wins series 4 – 0

=== (2) Saskatoon Blades vs. (7) Lethbridge Hurricanes ===
March 20	Saskatoon Blades	5 – 1	Lethbridge Hurricanes	Credit Union Centre
8:02 - Walker Wintoneak (1); 12:15 - Jyri Niemi (1); 18:56 - pp - Curtis Hamilton (1)		First period	Cam Braes (1) - 2:10
No scoring		Second period	No scoring
7:17 - pp - Stefan Elliott (1); 14:27 - Chris Langkow (1)		Third period	No scoring
Braden Holtby (22 saves / 23 shots)		Goalie stats	Brandon Anderson (21 saves / 26 shots)

March 21	Saskatoon Blades	2 – 5	Lethbridge Hurricanes	Credit Union Centre
No scoring		First period	Zach Boychuk (1) - 2:58; Zach Boychuk (2) - 17:34
No scoring		Second period	No scoring
9:14 - Milan Kytnár (1); 16:25 - Walker Wintoneak (2)		Third period	Carter Ashton (1) - pp - 1:30; Zach Boychuk (3) - pp - 11:00; Dwight King (1) - sh - en - 19:07
Braden Holtby (18 saves / 22 shots)		Goalie stats	Juha Metsola (21 saves / 23 shots)

March 24	Lethbridge Hurricanes	1 – 3	Saskatoon Blades	Enmax Centre
5:24 - pp - Austin Fyten (1)		First period	No scoring
No scoring		Second period	Milan Kytnár (2) - pp - 3:22; Derek Hulak (1) - 10:06
No scoring		Third period	Adam Chorneyko (1) - 6:42
Juha Metsola (16 saves / 19 shots)		Goalie stats	Braden Holtby (27 saves / 28 shots)

March 25	Lethbridge Hurricanes	2 – 1	Saskatoon Blades	Enmax Centre
No scoring		First period	Gaelan Patterson (1) - 16:38
No scoring		Second period	No scoring
3:08 - Zach Boychuk (4); 10:57 - Zach Boychuk (5)		Third period	No scoring
Juha Metsola (22 saves / 23 shots)		Goalie stats	Braden Holtby (22 saves / 24 shots)

March 28	Saskatoon Blades	1 – 3	Lethbridge Hurricanes	Credit Union Centre
11:46 - Derek Hulak (2)		First period	Colton Sceviour (1) - 5:45
No scoring		Second period	Zach Boychuk (6) - sh - 19:55
No scoring		Third period	Kyle Beach (1) - 6:29
Braden Holtby (28 saves / 31 shots)		Goalie stats	Juha Metsola (31 saves / 32 shots)

March 30	Lethbridge Hurricanes	1 – 5	Saskatoon Blades	Enmax Centre
No scoring		First period	Milan Kytnár (3) - 7:08; Teigan Zahn (1) - 12:50
0:44 - sh - Drew Hoff (1)		Second period	Josh Nicholls (1) - 8:54
No scoring		Third period	Adam Chorneyko (2) - pp - 15:21; Josh Nicholls (2) - pp - 18:04
Juha Metsola (29 saves / 34 shots)		Goalie stats	Braden Holtby (26 saves / 27 shots)

March 31	Saskatoon Blades	3 – 4	Lethbridge Hurricanes	Credit Union Centre
No scoring		First period	Colton Sceviour (2) - 14:30
12:42 - pp - Chris Langkow (2)		Second period	Colton Sceviour (3) - 1:25
11:39 - Burke Gallimore (1); 16:33 - Derek Hulak (3)		Third period	Zach Boychuk (7) - pp - 5:40; Luca Sbisa (1) - pp - 13:21
Braden Holtby (22 saves / 26 shots)		Goalie stats	Juha Metsola (24 saves / 27 shots)

Lethbridge wins series 4 – 3

=== (3) Brandon Wheat Kings vs. (6) Kootenay Ice ===
March 20	Brandon Wheat Kings	7 – 2	Kootenay Ice	Westman Place
6:53 - Andrew Clark (1)		First period	No scoring
6:37 - Brayden Schenn (1); 15:13 - Brayden Schenn (2)		Second period	No scoring
1:47 - pp - Colby Robak (1); 5:10 - pp - Nathan Green (1); 5:38 - pp - Nathan Green (2); 14:34 - pp - Matt Calvert (1)		Third period	Max Reinhart (1) - 3:40; Ian Barteaux (1) - pp - 12:35
Andrew Hayes (25 saves / 27 shots)		Goalie stats	Todd Mathews (27 saves / 33 shots); Scott Orth (3 saves / 4 shots)

March 21	Brandon Wheat Kings	4 – 1	Kootenay Ice	Westman Place
0:25 - Andrew Clark (2)		First period	Dominik Pacovský (1) - sh - 10:52
3:33 - Aaron Lewadniuk (1)		Second period	No scoring
8:29 - Matt Lowry (1); 19:39 - en - Scott Glennie (1)		Third period	No scoring
Andrew Hayes (25 saves / 26 shots)		Goalie stats	Todd Mathews (27 saves / 30 shots)

March 24	Kootenay Ice	3 – 4	OT	Brandon Wheat Kings	Cranbrook Recreational Complex
No scoring		First period		Brayden Schenn (3) - 5:23
2:40 - Steele Boomer (1); 7:49 - pp - Kevin King (1)		Second period		Matt Calvert (2) - 14:26; Matt Lowry (2) - 19:19
9:52 - pp - Tylan Stephens (1)		Third period		No scoring
No scoring		First overtime period		Matt Calvert (3) - 2:55
Todd Mathews (32 saves / 36 shots)		Goalie stats		Andrew Hayes (30 saves / 33 shots)

March 25	Kootenay Ice	3 – 4	Brandon Wheat Kings	Cranbrook Recreational Complex
No scoring		First period	Matt Calvert (4) - 6:42; Andrew Clark (3) - 8:48
0:43 - Kevin King (2)		Second period	No scoring
7:47 - pp - Andrew Bailey (1); 12:04 - pp - Andrew Bailey (2)		Third period	Brodie Melnychuk (1) - 4:39; Brayden Schenn (4) - 17:20
Todd Mathews (22 saves / 26 shots)		Goalie stats	Andrew Hayes (28 saves / 31 shots)

Brandon wins series 4 – 0

=== (4) Swift Current Broncos vs. (5) Medicine Hat Tigers ===
March 20	Swift Current Broncos	4 – 2	Medicine Hat Tigers	InnovationPlex
No scoring		First period	Tyler Ennis (1) - pp - 11:41
11:59 - Keegan Dansereau (1)		Second period	No scoring
7:46 - Taylor Vause (1); 13:05 - Keegan Dansereau (2); 19:24 - en - Keegan Dansereau (3)		Third period	Tyler Ennis (2) - 1:04
Travis Yonkman (36 saves / 38 shots)		Goalie stats	Ryan Holfeld (29 saves / 32 shots)

March 21	Swift Current Broncos	2 – 6	Medicine Hat Tigers	InnovationPlex
No scoring		First period	Sean Ringrose (1) - 4:34; Brennan Bosch (1) - pp - 7:36; Brennan Bosch (2) - 9:50
7:54 - pp - John Negrin (1); 17:16 - pp - Taylor Vause (2)		Second period	No scoring
No scoring		Third period	Tyler Ennis (3) - 5:27; Wacey Hamilton (1) - pp - 9:41; Matt McCue (1) - pp - 19:16
Travis Yonkman (28 saves / 34 shots)		Goalie stats	Ryan Holfeld (22 saves / 24 shots)

March 24	Medicine Hat Tigers	2 – 5	Swift Current Broncos	Medicine Hat Arena
No scoring		First period	Justin Dowling (1) - 4:46
14:40 - Tyler Ennis (4)		Second period	Taylor Vause (3) - 2:13; Justin Dowling (2) - pp - 11:15; John Negrin (2) - 17:35
16:20 - Zdeněk Okál (1)		Third period	Michael Stickland (1) - pp - 17:12
Ryan Holfeld (32 saves / 37 shots)		Goalie stats	Travis Yonkman (26 saves / 28 shots)

March 25	Medicine Hat Tigers	5 – 3	Swift Current Broncos	Medicine Hat Arena
3:18 - Tyler Ennis (5); 8:02 - Bretton Cameron (1); 19:44 - Tyler Ennis (6)		First period	Michael Brown (1) - pp - 2:33
7:26 - sh - Tyler Ennis (7)		Second period	Dillon Wagner (1) - pp - 5:06
5:59 - Bretton Cameron (2)		Third period	Taylor Vause (4) - pp - 11:04
Ryan Holfeld (28 saves / 31 shots)		Goalie stats	Travis Yonkman (24 saves / 29 shots)

March 27	Swift Current Broncos	5 – 3	Medicine Hat Tigers	InnovationPlex
10:08 - Cody Eakin (1); 13:26 - pp - Cody Eakin (2)		First period	Bretton Cameron (3) - 1:04; Tyler Ennis (8) - pp - 5:20
18:44 - Joel Rogers (1)		Second period	Sean Ringrose (2) - 4:48
6:14 - Dillon Wagner (2); 19:39 - en - Cody Eakin (3)		Third period	No scoring
Travis Yonkman (34 saves / 37 shots)		Goalie stats	Ryan Holfeld (41 saves / 45 shots)

March 29	Medicine Hat Tigers	3 – 0	Swift Current Broncos	Medicine Hat Arena
No scoring		First period	No scoring
2:55 - pp - Brennan Bosch (3); 15:29 - pp - Zdeněk Okál (2)		Second period	No scoring
7:02 - Brennan Bosch (4)		Third period	No scoring
Ryan Holfeld (22 saves / 22 shots)		Goalie stats	Travis Yonkman (18 saves / 21 shots)

March 31	Swift Current Broncos	1 – 4	Medicine Hat Tigers	InnovationPlex
9:21 - Michael Stickland (2)		First period	Zdeněk Okál (3) - 1:29; Sean Ringrose (3) - 19:12
No scoring		Second period	Zdeněk Okál (4) - 3:23
No scoring		Third period	Brennan Bosch (5) - en - 18:12
Travis Yonkman (17 saves / 20 shots)		Goalie stats	Ryan Holfeld (39 saves / 40 shots)

Medicine Hat wins series 4 – 3

=== (1) Vancouver Giants vs. (8) Prince George Cougars ===
March 20	Vancouver Giants	8 – 2	Prince George Cougars	Pacific Coliseum
16:55 - pp - Brent Regner (1)		First period	No scoring
5:30 - Lance Bouma (1); 5:39 - Evander Kane (1); 6:41 - Craig Schira (1); 8:20 - Andrej Kudrna (1); 9:39 - pp - Jonathon Blum (1)		Second period	Marek Viedenský (1) - sh - 4:28
13:27 - pp - Craig Schira (2); 17:21 - Mikhail Fisenko (1)		Third period	No scoring
Tyson Sexsmith (16 saves / 18 shots)		Goalie stats	Kevin Armstrong (25 saves / 31 shots); Joe Caligiuri (20 saves / 22 shots)

March 21	Vancouver Giants	9 – 1	Prince George Cougars	Pacific Coliseum
3:53 - sh - Michael Piluso (1); 15:46 - Lance Bouma (2)		First period	No scoring
1:26 - James Wright (1); 3:26 - Craig Cunningham (1); 9:43 - pp - Brendan Gallagher (1); 15:33 - pp - Casey Pierro-Zabotel (1); 17:01 - Nolan Toigo (1); 17:19 - Garry Nunn (1)		Second period	No scoring
2:09 - Casey Pierro-Zabotel (2)		Third period	Tyler Halliday (1) - pp - 18:28
Tyson Sexsmith (28 saves / 29 shots)		Goalie stats	Kevin Armstrong (29 saves / 37 shots); Mike Salmon (9 saves / 10 shots)

March 24	Prince George Cougars	2 – 3	OT	Vancouver Giants	Medicine Hat Arena
13:27 - Tyler Halliday (2)		First period		No scoring
13:26 - Brian Matte (1)		Second period		Evander Kane (2) - 5:31; Nolan Toigo (2) - 11:55
No scoring		Third period		No scoring
No scoring		First overtime period		Craig Cunningham (2) - 1644
Kevin Armstrong (49 saves / 52 shots)		Goalie stats		Tyson Sexsmith (31 saves / 33 shots)

March 25	Prince George Cougars	2 – 3	Vancouver Giants	Medicine Hat Arena
8:38 - Greg Fraser (1); 12:31 - Marek Viedenský (2)		First period	Lance Bouma (3) - 10:36; Jonathon Blum (2) - pp - 15:23
No scoring		Second period	Lance Bouma (4) - - pp - 6:16
No scoring		Third period	No scoring
Kevin Armstrong (45 saves / 48 shots)		Goalie stats	Tyson Sexsmith (26 saves / 28 shots)

Vancouver wins series 4 – 0

=== (4) Spokane Chiefs vs. (5) Seattle Thunderbirds ===
March 20	Spokane Chiefs	2 – 1	Seattle Thunderbirds	Spokane Veterans Memorial Arena
No scoring		First period	Charles Wells (1) - 9:32
4:21 - Drayson Bowman (1)		Second period	No scoring
11:44 - Drayson Bowman (2)		Third period	No scoring
Dustin Tokarski (31 saves / 32 shots)		Goalie stats	Calvin Pickard (36 saves / 38 shots)

March 21	Spokane Chiefs	1 – 2	Seattle Thunderbirds	Spokane Veterans Memorial Arena
No scoring		First period	No scoring
No scoring		Second period	Thomas Hickey (1) - pp - 15:37
16:26 - Drayson Bowman (3)		Third period	Sena Acolatse (1) - 5:11
Dustin Tokarski (26 saves / 28 shots)		Goalie stats	Calvin Pickard (33 saves / 34 shots)

March 24	Seattle Thunderbirds	1 – 5	Spokane Chiefs	accesso ShoWare Center
7:13 - Colin Jacobs (1)		First period	Tyler Johnson (1) - 14:10; Stefan Ulmer (1) - pp - 16:28; Levko Koper (1) - sh - 18:22
No scoring		Second period	Levko Koper (2) - pp - 5:53; Jared Spurgeon (1) - sh - 16:51
No scoring		Third period	No scoring
Calvin Pickard (29 saves / 34 shots)		Goalie stats	Dustin Tokarski (32 saves / 33 shots)

March 25	Seattle Thunderbirds	2 – 3	Spokane Chiefs	accesso ShoWare Center
4:18 - Jim O'Brien (1); 7:00 - Jeremy Schappert (1)		First period	Justin McCrae (1) - 3:21
No scoring		Second period	Tyler Johnson (2) - 8:22; Ondřej Roman (1) - pp - 10:00
No scoring		Third period	No scoring
Calvin Pickard (34 saves / 37 shots)		Goalie stats	Dustin Tokarski (28 saves / 30 shots)

March 28	Spokane Chiefs	5 – 3	Seattle Thunderbirds	Spokane Veterans Memorial Arena
No scoring		First period	No scoring
6:29 - Drayson Bowman (4); 13:30 - Justin McCrae (2)		Second period	Colin Jacobs (2) - 15:50
5:21 - Brady Calla (1); 14:31 - pp - Mitch Wahl (1); 19:18 - en - Drayson Bowman (5)		Third period	Prab Rai (1) - pp - 12:59; Thomas Hickey (2) - 18:39
Dustin Tokarski (31 saves / 34 shots)		Goalie stats	Calvin Pickard (30 saves / 34 shots)

Spokane wins series 4 – 1

=== (2) Tri-City Americans vs. (7) Seattle Thunderbirds ===
March 20	Tri-City Americans	6 – 5	OT	Everett Silvertips	Toyota Center
6:43 - Johnny Lazo (1)		First period		Daniel Iwanski (1) - pp - 1:55; Ryan White (1) - pp - 4:56
5:40 - pp - Tyler Schmidt (1); 8:12 - Kruise Reddick (1); 13:56 - Adam Hughesman (1)		Second period		No scoring
16:47 - Lane Werbowski (1)		Third period		Ryan White (2) - 5:47; Tyler Maxwell (1) - 16:56; Daniel Bartek (1) - 19:38
11:13 - Justin Feser (1)		First overtime period		No scoring
Chet Pickard (26 saves / 31 shots)		Goalie stats		Thomas Heemskerk (39 saves / 45 shots)

March 21	Tri-City Americans	2 – 3	Everett Silvertips	Toyota Center
13:33 - pp - Kruise Reddick (2)		First period	Tyler Maxwell (2) - pp - 1:55
No scoring		Second period	Tyler Maxwell (3) - pp - 13:52
4:29 - pp - Jason Reese (1)		Third period	Tyler Maxwell (4) - pp - 3:49
Chet Pickard (18 saves / 21 shots)		Goalie stats	Thomas Heemskerk (45 saves / 47 shots)

March 24	Everett Silvertips	2 – 4	Tri-City Americans	Xfinity Arena
No scoring		First period	Mitch Fadden (1) - pp - 5:57; Justin Feser (2) - 19:27
7:23 - Zack Dailey (1)		Second period	Johnny Lazo (2) - 6:47; Jason Reese (2) - pp - 16:09
11:07 - Tyler Maxwell (5)		Third period	No scoring
Thomas Heemskerk (27 saves / 31 shots)		Goalie stats	Chet Pickard (26 saves / 28 shots)

March 25	Everett Silvertips	1 – 4	Tri-City Americans	Xfinity Arena
10:39 - pp - Daniel Bartek (2)		First period	No scoring
No scoring		Second period	Johnny Lazo (3) - 3:52
No scoring		Third period	Tyler Schmidt (2) - 12:50; Mitch Fadden (2) - 13:26; Jason Reese (3) - pp - 16:30
Thomas Heemskerk (51 saves / 55 shots)		Goalie stats	Chet Pickard (23 saves / 24 shots)

March 28	Tri-City Americans	6 – 1	Everett Silvertips	Toyota Center
10:07 - Mitch McColm (1); 11:26 - pp - Jason Reese (4)		First period	No scoring
4:05 - Jordan Messier (1); 19:43 - pp - Taylor Procyshen (1)		Second period	No scoring
2:34 - Brooks Macek (1); 3:57 - Jordan Messier (2)		Third period	Kellan Tochkin (1) - pp - 6:09
Chet Pickard (26 saves / 27 shots)		Goalie stats	Thomas Heemskerk (33 saves / 39 shots)

Tri-City wins series 4 – 1

=== (3) Kelowna Rockets vs. (6) Kamloops Blazers ===
March 20	Kelowna Rockets	4 – 2	Kamloops Blazers	Prospera Place
No scoring		First period	Scott Wasden (1) - 10:48
2:28 - Štěpán Novotný (1); 10:18 - pp - Tyler Myers (1); 14:23 - pp - Tyson Barrie (1)		Second period	No scoring
4:55 - Colin Long (1)		Third period	Kenton Dulle (1) - pp - 8:30
Mark Guggenberger (20 saves / 22 shots)		Goalie stats	Justin Leclerc (30 saves / 34 shots)

March 21	Kelowna Rockets	5 – 1	Kamloops Blazers	Prospera Place
11:52 - Ian Duval (1); 18:40 - Jamie Benn (1)		First period	No scoring
3:44 - Ryley Grantham (1)		Second period	No scoring
6:41 - Ryley Grantham (2); 17:39 - Štěpán Novotný (2)		Third period	Kenton Dulle (2) - sh - 10:52
Mark Guggenberger (29 saves / 30 shots)		Goalie stats	Justin Leclerc (37 saves / 42 shots)

March 24	Kamloops Blazers	2 – 3	OT	Kelowna Rockets	Interior Savings Centre
9:30 - sh - Seth Compton (1)		First period		No scoring
No scoring		Second period		No scoring
11:16 - pp - Giffen Nyren (1)		Third period		Jamie Benn (2) - 14:05; Cody Almond (1) - 19:57
No scoring		First overtime period		Cody Almond (2) - 12:21
Justin Leclerc (36 saves / 39 shots)		Goalie stats		Mark Guggenberger (16 saves / 18 shots)

March 25	Kamloops Blazers	3 – 5	Kelowna Rockets	Interior Savings Centre
3:57 - pp - Colin Smith (1)		First period	Jamie Benn (3) - 19:17
0:56 - pp - C.J. Stretch (1); 6:51 - sh - Kenton Dulle (3)		Second period	Tyler Myers (2) - pp - 4:45; Ian Duval (2) - pp - 8:21; Tyson Barrie (2) - 12:24; Štěpán Novotný (3) - 14:32
No scoring		Third period	No scoring
Justin Leclerc (38 saves / 43 shots)		Goalie stats	Mark Guggenberger (21 saves / 24 shots)

Kelowna wins series 4 – 0

== Conference Semi-finals ==
=== (1) Calgary Hitmen vs. (7) Lethbridge Hurricanes ===
April 3	Calgary Hitmen	7 – 1	Lethbridge Hurricanes	Scotiabank Saddledome
9:42 - Carson McMillan (2); 13:54 - Brandon Kozun (4)		First period	No scoring
3:28 - pp - Paul Postma (1)		Second period	No scoring
4:59 - Paul Postma (2); 8:08 - Joel Broda (4); 10:42 - pp - Brandon Kozun (5); 18:09 - Joel Broda (5)		Third period	Mitch Versteeg (1) - pp - 4:26
Martin Jones (15 saves / 16 shots)		Goalie stats	Juha Metsola (23 saves / 28 shots); Michael Tadjdeh (6 saves / 8 shots)

April 5	Calgary Hitmen	2 – 1	Lethbridge Hurricanes	Scotiabank Saddledome
8:57 - pp - Kris Foucault (5)		First period	No scoring
15:09 - pp - Tomáš Karpov (1)		Second period	Luca Sbisa (2) - 0:17
No scoring		Third period	No scoring
Martin Jones (23 saves / 24 shots)		Goalie stats	Juha Metsola (29 saves / 31 shots)

April 7	Lethbridge Hurricanes	2 – 4	Calgary Hitmen	Enmax Centre
No scoring		First period	Kris Foucault (6) - pp - 12:03
No scoring		Second period	Keith Seabrook (1) - 3:38; Tomáš Karpov (2) - 5:19; Michael Stone (1) - pp - 17:03
3:14 - pp - Mitch Versteeg (2); 19:37 - Colton Sceviour (4)		Third period	No scoring
Juha Metsola (29 saves / 33 shots)		Goalie stats	Martin Jones (17 saves / 19 shots)

April 8	Lethbridge Hurricanes	0 – 6	Calgary Hitmen	Enmax Centre
No scoring		First period	Brett Sonne (1) - 1:30; Joel Broda (6) - 1:52
No scoring		Second period	Alex Plante (2) - pp - 2:02
No scoring		Third period	Kris Foucault (7) - 11:37; Brandon Kozun (6) - ps - 13:38; Ian Schultz (3) - pp - 14:32
Juha Metsola (18 saves / 24 shots)		Goalie stats	Martin Jones (18 saves / 18 shots)

Calgary wins series 4 – 0

=== (3) Brandon Wheat Kings vs. (6) Medicine Hat Tigers ===
April 4	Medicine Hat Tigers	3 – 6	Brandon Wheat Kings	Medicine Hat Arena
No scoring		First period	No scoring
Linden Vey (1) - pp - 2:51; Thomas Carr (1) - 8:55; Sean Ringrose (4) - pp - 14:43		Second period	4:41 - Del Cowan (1); 7:33 - Nathan Green (3); 7:59 - Jordan Hale (1); 13:40 - Matt Calvert (5)
No scoring		Third period	11:45 - Nathan Green (4); 18:39 - Mark Stone (1)
Ryan Holfeld (25 saves / 31 shots)		Goalie stats	Andrew Hayes (28 saves / 31 shots)

April 5	Medicine Hat Tigers	6 – 8	Brandon Wheat Kings	Medicine Hat Arena
Bretton Cameron (4) - 1:19; Zdeněk Okál (5) - 7:39; Zdeněk Okál (6) - pp - 12:33; Brennan Bosch (6) - 14:04; Zdeněk Okál (7) - 16:36		First period	3:40 - Andrew Clark (4); 6:51 - Keith Aulie (1); 19:21 - pp - Brayden Schenn (5)
No scoring		Second period	2:06 - pp - Matt Lowry (3); 17:26 - pp - Matt Calvert (6)
Linden Vey (2) - pp - 15:47		Third period	5:50 - Andrew Clark (5); 15:15 - Brodie Melnychuk (2); 19:25 - en - Andrew Clark (6)
Ryan Holfeld (24 saves / 31 shots)		Goalie stats	Andrew Hayes (4 saves / 8 shots); James Priestner (11 saves / 13 shots)

April 8	Brandon Wheat Kings	6 – 1	Medicine Hat Tigers	Westman Place
Brayden Schenn (6) - 0:42; Scott Glennie (2) - 6:00; Aaron Lewadniuk (2) - 7:00		First period	2:45 - Colton Grant (1)
Matt Calvert (7) - pp - 4:08; Colby Robak (2) - 10:12		Second period	No scoring
Andrew Clark (7) - 2:53		Third period	No scoring
Andrew Hayes (19 saves / 20 shots)		Goalie stats	Ryan Holfeld (4 saves / 7 shots); Tyler Bunz (37 saves / 40 shots)

April 10	Brandon Wheat Kings	6 – 2	Medicine Hat Tigers	Westman Place
Aaron Lewadniuk (3) - 4:43; Scott Glennie (3) - 18:48; Colby Robak (3) - 19:33		First period	2:16 - Jace Coyle (1); 9:52 - Travis Dunstall (1)
Nathan Green (5) - pp - 3:07; Colby Robak (4) - 4:46		Second period	No scoring
Colby Robak (5) - pp - 5:42		Third period	No scoring
Andrew Hayes (19 saves / 21 shots)		Goalie stats	Tyler Bunz (10 saves / 13 shots); Ryan Holfeld (18 saves / 21 shots)

Brandon wins series 4 – 0

=== (1) Vancouver Giants vs. (4) Spokane Chiefs ===
April 3	Vancouver Giants	3 – 1	Spokane Chiefs	Pacific Coliseum
16:56 - Michael Piluso (2)		First period	No scoring
No scoring		Second period	No scoring
19:16 - en - Craig Cunningham (3)		Third period	Mitch Wahl (2) - pp - 4:44
Tyson Sexsmith (18 saves / 19 shots)		Goalie stats	Dustin Tokarski (36 saves / 38 shots)

April 4	Vancouver Giants	4 – 1	Spokane Chiefs	Pacific Coliseum
5:09 - Jonathon Blum (3); 16:23 - pp - Craig Cunningham (4)		First period	No scoring
6:11 - pp - Jonathon Blum (4); 9:05 - Casey Pierro-Zabotel (3)		Second period	No scoring
No scoring		Third period	Drayson Bowman (6) - pp - 6:56
Tyson Sexsmith (18 saves / 19 shots)		Goalie stats	Dustin Tokarski (30 saves / 34 shots)

April 7	Spokane Chiefs	5 – 2	Vancouver Giants	Spokane Veterans Memorial Arena
8:20 - pp - Levko Koper (3)		First period	Jonathon Blum (5) - pp - 10:04; Lance Bouma (5) - 13:08
15:17 - Jared Spurgeon (2)		Second period	No scoring
6:29 - Drayson Bowman (7); 16:00 - Justin McCrae (3); 19:40 - en - Mike Reddington (1)		Third period	No scoring
Dustin Tokarski (16 saves / 18 shots)		Goalie stats	Tyson Sexsmith (23 saves / 27 shots)

April 8	Spokane Chiefs	1 – 0	Vancouver Giants	Spokane Veterans Memorial Arena
12:31 - pp - Tyler Johnson (3)		First period	No scoring
No scoring		Second period	No scoring
No scoring		Third period	No scoring
Dustin Tokarski (41 saves / 41 shots)		Goalie stats	Tyson Sexsmith (17 saves / 18 shots)

April 10	Vancouver Giants	2 – 3	4OT	Spokane Chiefs	Pacific Coliseum
2:45 - pp - Evander Kane (3); 13:21 - pp - Brent Regner (2)		First period		Tyler Johnson (4) - pp - 9:20
No scoring		Second period		No scoring
No scoring		Third period		Drayson Bowman (8) - 4:25
No scoring		Fourth overtime period		Blake Gal (1) - 6:05
Tyson Sexsmith (54 saves / 57 shots)		Goalie stats		Dustin Tokarski (60 saves / 62 shots)

April 12	Spokane Chiefs	2 – 3	2OT	Vancouver Giants	Spokane Veterans Memorial Arena
5:38 - Tyler Johnson (5)		First period		No scoring
No scoring		Second period		No scoring
18:36 - Stefan Ulmer (2)		Third period		James Wright (2) - 3:07; James Wright (3) - 11:03
No scoring		Second overtime period		Evander Kane (4) - 5:31
Dustin Tokarski (37 saves / 40 shots)		Goalie stats		Tyson Sexsmith (31 saves / 33 shots)

April 14	Vancouver Giants	1 – 0	OT	Spokane Chiefs	Pacific Coliseum
No scoring		First period		No scoring
No scoring		Second period		No scoring
No scoring		Third period		No scoring
1:56 - Nick Ross (1)		First overtime period		No scoring
Tyson Sexsmith (29 saves / 29 shots)		Goalie stats		Dustin Tokarski (41 saves / 42 shots)

Vancouver wins series 4 – 3

=== (2) Tri-City Americans vs. (3) Kelowna Rockets ===
April 3	Tri-City Americans	4 – 3	Kelowna Rockets	Toyota Center
No scoring		First period	No scoring
15:00 - pp - Jason Reese (5)		Second period	Evan Bloodoff (1) - 5:38
1:36 - Kruise Reddick (3); 4:31 - Jarrett Toll (1); 18:07 - pp - Taylor Procyshen (2)		Third period	Lucas Bloodoff (1) - 5:19; Tyson Barrie (3) - pp - 6:58
Chet Pickard (23 saves / 26 shots)		Goalie stats	Mark Guggenberger (35 saves / 39 shots)

April 4	Tri-City Americans	3 – 2	Kelowna Rockets	Toyota Center
No scoring		First period	Jamie Benn (4) - pp - 5:39
No scoring		Second period	Cody Almond (3) - 16:32
5:43 - Brooks Macek (2); 9:44 - Petr Stoklasa (1); 17:17 - pp - Taylor Procyshen (3)		Third period	No scoring
Chet Pickard (24 saves / 26 shots)		Goalie stats	Mark Guggenberger (31 saves / 34 shots)

April 7	Kelowna Rockets	7 – 2	Tri-City Americans	Prospera Place
11:07 - Mikael Backlund (1); 18:23 - pp - Štěpán Novotný (4)		First period	No scoring
2:17 - pp - Cody Almond (4); 3:24 - pp - Ian Duval (3); 9:55 - pp - Tyler Myers (3); 19:07 - Lucas Bloodoff (2)		Second period	Justin Feser (3) - pp - 12:42
10:00 - Jamie Benn (5)		Third period	Zachary Yuen (1) - 0:20
Mark Guggenberger (15 saves / 17 shots)		Goalie stats	Chet Pickard (18 saves / 24 shots); Brett Martyniuk (10 saves / 11 shots)

April 8	Kelowna Rockets	4 – 3	OT	Tri-City Americans	Prospera Place
12:31 - pp - Mikael Backlund (2)		First period		No scoring
No scoring		Second period		Mitch Fadden (3) - 5:36; Jordan Messier (3) - 13:22
2:41 - Cody Almond (5); 10:37 - pp - Tyler Myers (4)		Third period		Justin Feser (4) - pp - 9:30
12:52 - pp - Jamie Benn (6)		First overtime period		No scoring
Mark Guggenberger (26 saves / 29 shots)		Goalie stats		Chet Pickard (34 saves / 38 shots)

April 10	Tri-City Americans	2 – 5	Kelowna Rockets	Toyota Center
11:11 - Petr Stoklasa (2)		First period	Lucas Bloodoff (3) - 6:44; Ian Duval (4) - 7:24
No scoring		Second period	Štěpán Novotný (5) - pp - 1:36
17:01 - Jordan Messier (4)		Third period	Mikael Backlund (3) - 2:01; Colin Long (2) - en - 19:26
Chet Pickard (20 saves / 24 shots)		Goalie stats	Mark Guggenberger (24 saves / 26 shots)

April 12	Kelowna Rockets	6 – 2	Tri-City Americans	Prospera Place
15:43 - Mikael Backlund (4)		First period	Taylor Procyshen (4) - pp - 10:28
4:45 - Jamie Benn (7); 8:13 - Curt Gogol (1); 12:20 - sh - Mikael Backlund (5); 14:59 - Ian Duval (5); 18:50 - Evan Bloodoff (2)		Second period	Brooks Macek (3) - 9:19
No scoring		Third period	No scoring
Mark Guggenberger (12 saves / 14 shots)		Goalie stats	Chet Pickard (26 saves / 32 shots); Brett Martyniuk (2 saves / 2 shots)

Kelowna wins series 4 – 2

== Conference Finals ==
=== (1) Calgary Hitmen vs. (3) Brandon Wheat Kings ===
April 17	Calgary Hitmen	9 – 3	Brandon Wheat Kings	Scotiabank Saddledome
13:11 - Alex Plante (3)		First period	No scoring
2:09 - pp - Kyle Bortis (2); 4:20 - Boštjan Goličič (1); 6:02 - pp - Kris Foucault (8); 7:45 - Kyle Bortis (3); 10:47 - Tyler Fiddler (1); 12:56 - Paul Postma (3)		Second period	Andrew Clark (8) - pp - 15:38
4:45 - Joel Broda (7); 18:18 - pp - Keith Seabrook (2)		Third period	Nathan Green (6) - 0:31; Brayden Schenn (7) - pp - 1:34
Martin Jones (18 saves / 21 shots)		Goalie stats	Andrew Hayes (10 saves / 16 shots); James Priestner (16 saves / 19 shots)

April 19	Calgary Hitmen	5 – 4	Brandon Wheat Kings	Scotiabank Saddledome
No scoring		First period	Matt Calvert (8) - 3:56; Brayden Schenn (8) - 17:55
14:23 - pp - Kyle Bortis (4); 16:38 - Joel Broda (8); 19:48 - Michael Stone (2)		Second period	Jay Fehr (1) - 15:52
10:54 - Ian Schultz (4); 13:10 - Brett Sonne (2)		Third period	Keith Aulie (2) - pp - 8:56
Martin Jones (21 saves / 25 shots)		Goalie stats	Andrew Hayes (22 saves / 27 shots)

April 21	Brandon Wheat Kings	3 – 4	OT	Calgary Hitmen	Westman Place
3:29 - pp - Aaron Lewadniuk (4); 8:37 - Colby Robak (6)		First period		Brett Sonne (3) - 17:39
No scoring		Second period		Kris Foucault (9) - 16:00
6:26 - pp - Matt Calvert (9)		Third period		Kris Foucault (10) - 0:12
No scoring		First overtime period		Ian Schultz (5) - 1:04
Andrew Hayes (28 saves / 32 shots)		Goalie stats		Martin Jones (24 saves / 27 shots)

April 22	Brandon Wheat Kings	4 – 6	Calgary Hitmen	Westman Place
No scoring		First period	Keith Seabrook (3) - pp - 7:23; Paul Postma (4) - 7:37
14:35 - Andrew Clark (9); 15:09 - Jordan Hale (2)		Second period	Alex Plante (4) - 3:47; Boštjan Goličič (2) - 6:41; Brett Sonne (4) - 7:51; Tomáš Karpov (3) - 19:26
12:50 - Jay Fehr (2); 15:26 - pp - Nathan Green (7)		Third period	No scoring
Andrew Hayes (15 saves / 19 shots); James Priestner (14 saves / 16 shots)		Goalie stats	Martin Jones (12 saves / 16 shots)

Calgary wins series 4 – 0

=== (1) Vancouver Giants vs. (3) Kelowna Rockets ===
April 18	Vancouver Giants	2 – 4	Kelowna Rockets	Pacific Coliseum
No scoring		First period	No scoring
No scoring		Second period	Mikael Backlund (6) - pp - 4:59; Mitch Callahan (1) - 13:16; Ian Duval (6) - 16:54
3:35 - pp - Lance Bouma (6); 14:01 - James Henry (1)		Third period	Ian Duval (7) - en - 19:31
Tyson Sexsmith (24 saves / 27 shots)		Goalie stats	Mark Guggenberger (20 saves / 22 shots)

April 19	Vancouver Giants	4 – 3	OT	Kelowna Rockets	Pacific Coliseum
5:02 - Evander Kane (5)		First period		No scoring
7:18 - pp - Mike Piluso (3); 17:14 - pp - Jonathon Blum (6)		Second period		Ian Duval (8) - 1:05
No scoring		Third period		Jamie Benn (8) - pp - 12:29; Cody Almond (6) - 16:36
19:25 - Casey Pierro-Zabotel (4)		First overtime period		No scoring
Tyson Sexsmith (28 saves / 31 shots)		Goalie stats		Mark Guggenberger (33 saves / 37 shots)

April 21	Kelowna Rockets	2 – 3	Vancouver Giants	Prospera Place
6:23 - Cody Almond (7)		First period	Garry Nunn (3) - pp - 17:53
No scoring		Second period	Craig Cunningham (5) - 11:57
1:03 - pp - Jamie Benn (9)		Third period	Lance Bouma (7) - 18:52
Mark Guggenberger (21 saves / 24 shots)		Goalie stats	Tyson Sexsmith (33 saves / 35 shots)

April 23	Kelowna Rockets	3 – 0	Vancouver Giants	Prospera Place
No scoring		First period	No scoring
7:15 - Ian Duval (9); 8:26 - Lucas Bloodoff (4)		Second period	No scoring
9:25 - Jamie Benn (10)		Third period	No scoring
Mark Guggenberger (14 saves / 14 shots)		Goalie stats	Tyson Sexsmith (31 saves / 34 shots)

April 25	Vancouver Giants	0 – 1	Kelowna Rockets	Pacific Coliseum
No scoring		First period	Ryley Grantham (3) - 18:22
No scoring		Second period	No scoring
No scoring		Third period	No scoring
Tyson Sexsmith (22 saves / 23 shots)		Goalie stats	Mark Guggenberger (25 saves / 25 shots)

April 27	Kelowna Rockets	5 – 4	OT	Vancouver Giants	Prospera Place
10:12 - Mikael Backlund (7)		First period		Jonathon Blum (7) - pp - 4:11; Evander Kane (6) - pp - 16:27; James Henry (2) - 18:58
17:19 - pp - Mikael Backlund (8)		Second period		No scoring
15:55 - pp - Jamie Benn (11); 16:28 - Cody Almond (8)		Third period		Evander Kane (7) - pp - 8:01
4:00 - Mikael Backlund (9)		First overtime period		No scoring
Mark Guggenberger (13 saves / 17 shots)		Goalie stats		Tyson Sexsmith (27 saves / 32 shots)

Kelowna wins series 4 – 2

== WHL Championship ==
=== (E1) Calgary Hitmen vs. (W3) Kelowna Rockets ===
May 1	Calgary Hitmen	1 – 3	Kelowna Rockets	Scotiabank Saddledome
No scoring		First period	Jamie Benn (12) - pp - 9:09
6:33 - Paul Postma (5)		Second period	No scoring
No scoring		Third period	Tyler Myers (5) - pp - 10:14; Jamie Benn (13) - sh - en - 19:32
Martin Jones (18 saves / 20 shots)		Goalie stats	Mark Guggenberger (28 saves / 29 shots)

May 2	Calgary Hitmen	2 – 5	Kelowna Rockets	Scotiabank Saddledome
No scoring		First period	No scoring
2:45 - Tomáš Karpov (4)		Second period	Evan Bloodoff (3) - 12:56
12:52 - Keith Seabrook (4)		Third period	Ian Duval (10) - 3:40; Mikael Backlund (10) - 5:22; Mikael Backlund (11) - 10:21; Colin Long (3) - en - 19:58
Martin Jones (22 saves / 26 shots)		Goalie stats	Mark Guggenberger (27 saves / 29 shots)

May 4	Kelowna Rockets	2 – 0	Calgary Hitmen	Prospera Place
15:15 - Ryley Grantham (4)		First period	No scoring
No scoring		Second period	No scoring
19:54 - en - Cody Almond (9)		Third period	No scoring
Mark Guggenberger (21 saves / 21 shots)		Goalie stats	Martin Jones (22 saves / 23 shots)

May 6	Kelowna Rockets	2 – 6	Calgary Hitmen	Prospera Place
No scoring		First period	Alex Plante (5) - pp - 1:17
0:35 - Mikael Backlund (12); 5:30 - Mikael Backlund (13)		Second period	Boštjan Goličič (3) - 12:05; Brett Sonne (5) - pp - 16:51; Brandon Kozun (7) - 18:36
No scoring		Third period	Brett Sonne (6) - 8:22; Carson McMillan (3) - pp - 18:11
Mark Guggenberger (29 saves / 35 shots)		Goalie stats	Martin Jones (35 saves / 37 shots)

May 7	Calgary Hitmen	6 – 1	Kelowna Rockets	Scotiabank Saddledome
16:29 - Kris Foucault (11)		First period	No scoring
3:48 - pp - Joel Broda (9); 12:29 - Brett Sonne (7); 18:38 - Joel Broda (10)		Second period	Cody Almond (10) - 11:10
14:39 - Alex Plante (6); 17:30 - Rigby Burgart (1)		Third period	No scoring
Martin Jones (18 saves / 19 shots)		Goalie stats	Mark Guggenberger (44 saves / 50 shots)

May 9	Kelowna Rockets	3 – 2	OT	Calgary Hitmen	Prospera Place
No scoring		First period		Boštjan Goličič (4) - sh - 7:45
11:43 - pp - Colin Long (4); 13:33 - Lucas Bloodoff (5)		Second period		No scoring
No scoring		Third period		Joel Broda (11) - pp - 12:57
8:13 - pp - Tyson Barrie (4)		First overtime period		No scoring
Mark Guggenberger (24 saves / 26 shots)		Goalie stats		Martin Jones (47 saves / 50 shots)

Kelowna wins series 4 – 2

== Playoff scoring leaders ==
Note: GP = Games played; G = Goals; A = Assists; Pts = Points; PIM = Penalty minutes

Player	Team	GP	G	A	Pts	PIM
Jamie Benn	Kelowna Rockets	19	13	20	33	9
Cody Almond	Kelowna Rockets	22	10	17	27	18
Joel Broda	Calgary Hitmen	18	11	13	24	18
Mikael Backlund	Kelowna Rockets	19	13	10	23	26
Tyler Myers	Kelowna Rockets	22	5	20	29	
Kyle Bortis	Calgary Hitmen	18	4	16	20	2
Tyler Ennis	Medicine Hat Tigers	11	8	11	19	10
Brandon Kozun	Calgary Hitmen	18	7	12	19	8
Ian Duval	Tri-City Americans	22	10	8	18	10
Brayden Schenn	Brandon Wheat Kings	12	8	10	18	12

== Playoff leading goaltenders ==
Note: GP = Games played; Mins = Minutes played; W = Wins; L = Losses; GA = Goals Allowed; SO = Shutouts; SV& = Save percentage; GAA = Goals against average

Player	Team	GP	Mins	W	L	GA	SO	Sv%	GAA
Dustin Tokarski	Spokane Chiefs	12	812	7	5	23	1	0.947	1.70
Martin Jones	Calgary Hitmen	18	1095	14	4	34	2	0.921	1.86
Tyson Sexsmith	Vancouver Giants	17	1150	10	7	36	1	0.927	1.88
Braden Holtby	Saskatoon Blades	7	414	3	4	16	0	0.912	2.32
Mark Guggenberger	Kelowna Rockets	22	1374	16	6	54	3	0.907	2.36

== Memorial Cup ==
The 91st Memorial Cup was held in Rimouski, Quebec.

== WHL awards ==
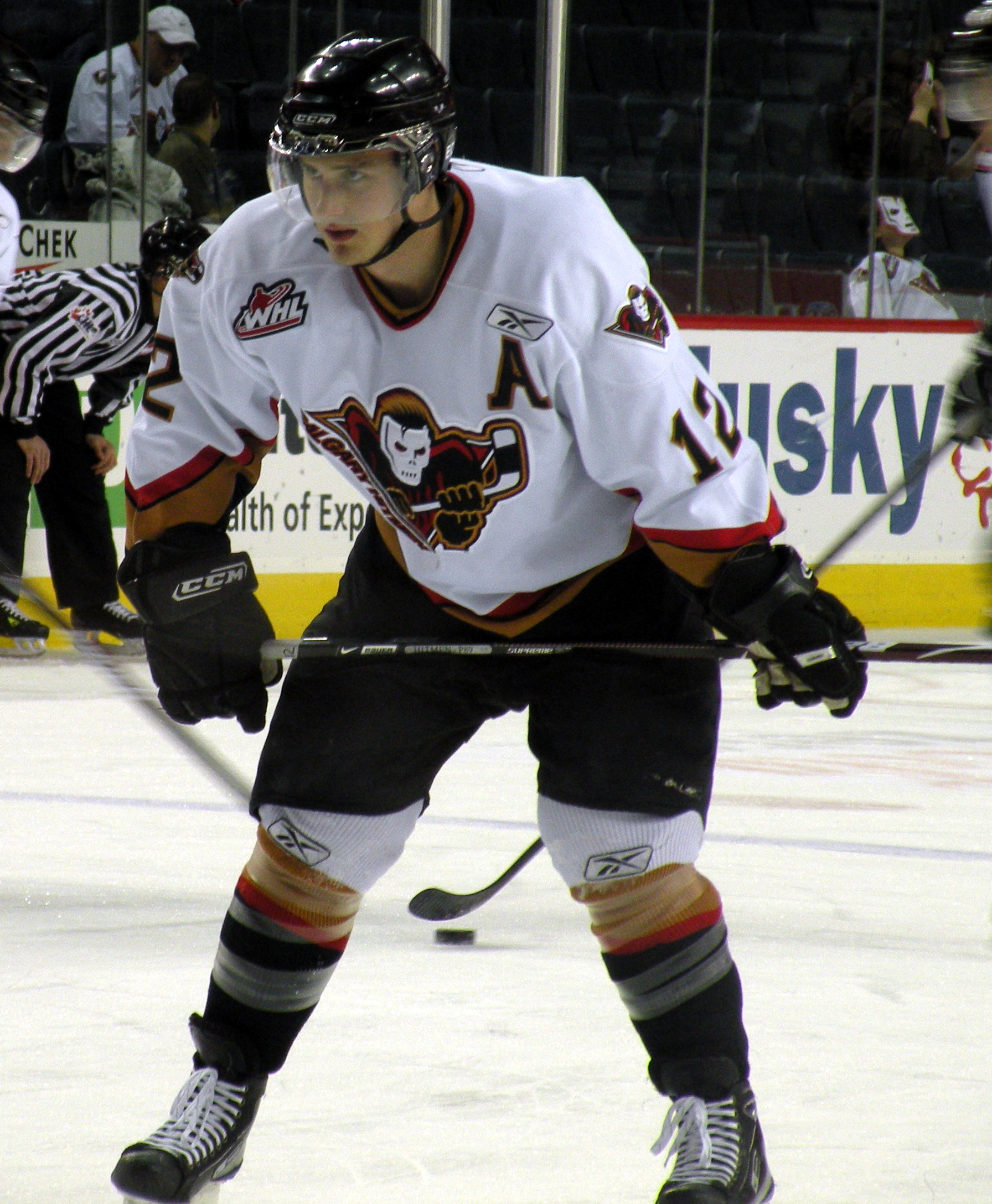
Brett Sonne was awarded the Four Broncos Memorial Trophy as the league's player of the year

Scotty Munro Memorial Trophy	Regular season champions	Calgary Hitmen	
Four Broncos Memorial Trophy	Player of the Year	Brett Sonne	Calgary Hitmen
Bob Clarke Trophy	Top Scorer	Casey Pierro-Zabotel	Vancouver Giants
Bill Hunter Trophy	Top Defenseman	Jonathon Blum	Vancouver Giants
Jim Piggott Memorial Trophy	Rookie of the Year	Brett Connolly	Prince George Cougars
Del Wilson Trophy	Top Goaltender	Chet Pickard	Tri-City Americans
WHL Plus-Minus Award	Top Plus-Minus Rating	Paul Postma	Calgary Hitmen
Brad Hornung Trophy	Most Sportsmanlike Player	Tyler Ennis	Medicine Hat Tigers
Daryl K. (Doc) Seaman Trophy	Scholastic Player of the Year	Stefan Elliott	Saskatoon Blades
Jim Donlevy Memorial Trophy	Scholastic team of the Year	Prince Albert Raiders	
Dunc McCallum Memorial Trophy	Coach of the Year	Don Hay	Vancouver Giants
Lloyd Saunders Memorial Trophy	Executive of the Year	Kelly Kisio	Calgary Hitmen
Allen Paradice Memorial Trophy	Top Official	Chris Savage	
St. Clair Group Trophy	Marketing/Public Relations Award	Mike Bortolussi	Medicine Hat Tigers
Doug Wickenheiser Memorial Trophy	Humanitarian of the Year	Taylor Procyshen	Tri-City Americans
WHL Playoff MVP	WHL Finals Most Valuable Player	Tyler Myers	Kelowna Rockets
Professional Hockey Achievement; Academic Recipient	Alumni Achievement Awards	Trevor Linden; Dan Hulak	

- Source WHL Announces 2008-09 Award Winners

== All-Star teams ==
Eastern Conference
	First Team		Second Team	
Goal	Braden Holtby	Saskatoon Blades	Martin Jones	Calgary Hitmen
Defense	Paul Postma	Calgary Hitmen	Michael Stone	Calgary Hitmen
Defense	Keith Aulie	Brandon Wheat Kings	John Negrin	Swift Current Broncos
Forward	Brett Sonne	Calgary Hitmen	Joel Broda	Calgary Hitmen
Forward	Tyler Ennis	Medicine Hat Tigers	Justin Bernhardt	Prince Albert Raiders
Forward	Brandon Kozun	Calgary Hitmen	Brayden Schenn	Brandon Wheat Kings
Western Conference
	First Team		Second Team	
Goal	Chet Pickard	Tri-City Americans	Dustin Tokarski	Spokane Chiefs
Defense	Jonathon Blum	Vancouver Giants	Tyler Myers	Kelowna Rockets
Defense	Thomas Hickey	Seattle Thunderbirds	Brent Regner	Vancouver Giants
Forward	Casey Pierro-Zabotel	Vancouver Giants	Drayson Bowman	Spokane Chiefs
Forward	Jamie Benn	Kelowna Rockets	Colin Long	Kelowna Rockets
Forward	Evander Kane	Vancouver Giants	Taylor Procyshen	Tri-City Americans

- Source: WHL Announces 2008–09 Conference All-Star Teams and Award Finalists

== See also ==
- List of WHL seasons
- 2008–09 OHL season
- 2008–09 QMJHL season
- 2008 in ice hockey
- 2009 in ice hockey

Preceded by 2007–08 WHL season	WHL seasons	Succeeded by 2009–10 WHL season
