= Colin Long =

Colin Long may refer to:

- Colin Long (ice hockey) (born 1989), American ice hockey center
- Colin Long (tennis) (1918–2009), Australian tennis player
- Colin Long (Emmerdale), fictional character on the ITV soap opera Emmerdale
