= Vause =

Vause is both a given name and surname. Notable people with the name include:

- Alex Vause, fictional character
- John Vause (born 1968), Australian journalist
- Taylor Vause (born 1991), Canadian ice hockey player
- Vause Raw (1921–2001), South African politician
