= Keith Seabrook =

Canadian ice hockey player

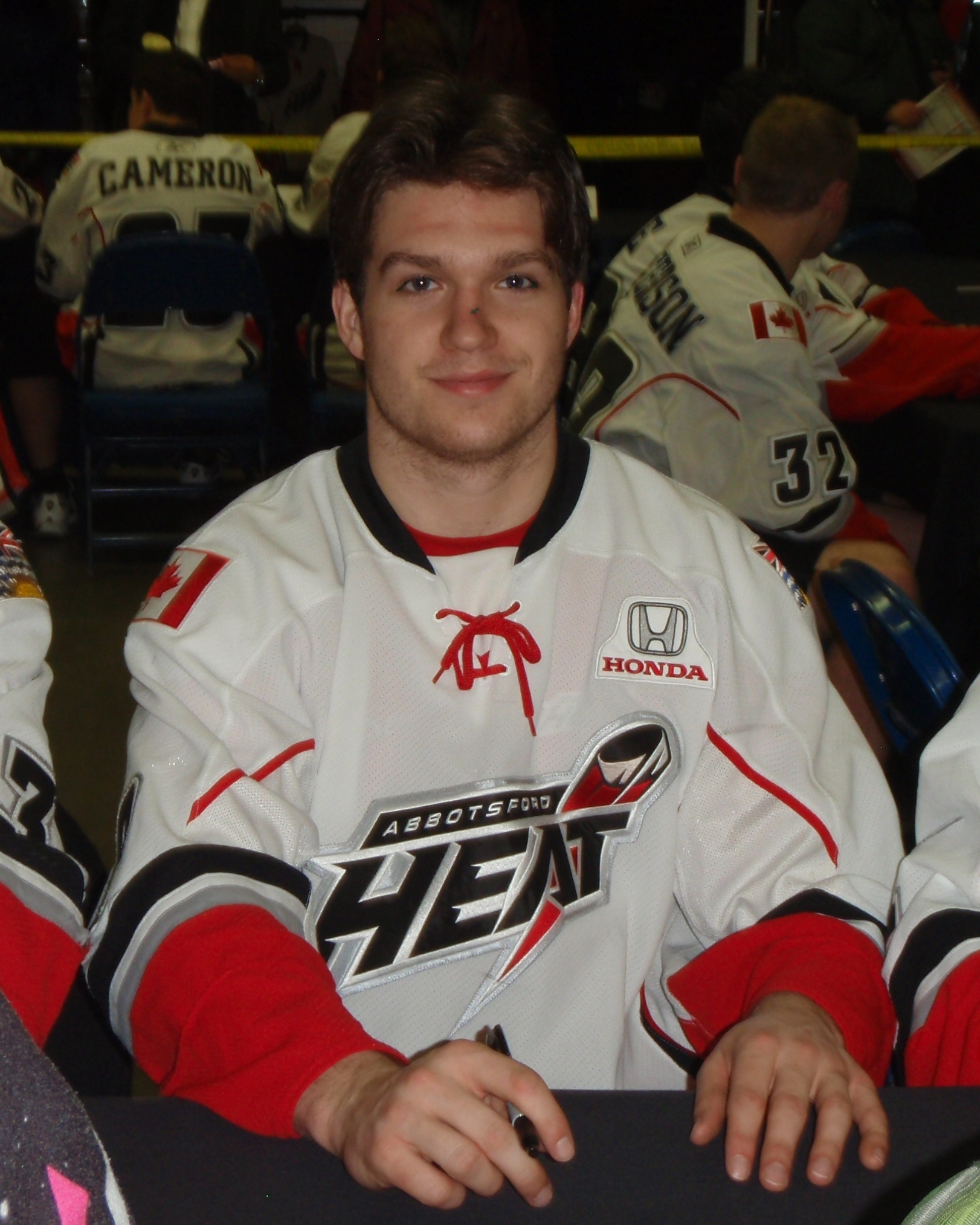
- Born: August 2, 1988 (age 38) Delta, British Columbia, Canada
- Height: 6 ft 0 in (183 cm)
- Weight: 198 lb (90 kg; 14 st 2 lb)
- Position: Defence
- Shot: Right
- Played for: Abbotsford Heat; Manitoba Moose; San Antonio Rampage; HC Pustertal Wölfe; Rockford IceHogs
- NHL draft: 52nd overall, 2006; Washington Capitals
- Playing career: 2009–2015

Keith Seabrook (born August 2, 1988) is a Canadian former professional ice hockey player. He played four seasons in the AHL for the Abbotsford Heat, Manitoba Moose and San Antonio Rampage and the Rockford IceHogs and one season in Italy's Serie A for the HC Pustertal Wölfe before taking a time-out from hockey midway through the 2012–13 season.

== Playing career ==
Seabrook played junior hockey for the Coquitlam/Burnaby Express in the BCHL from 2004–2006.

In 2006, Seabrook was selected by the Washington Capitals in the second round (52nd overall) of the 2006 NHL entry draft. Seabrook then played one season for the University of Denver, before joining the WHL Calgary Hitmen major junior hockey team for two seasons. On July 16, 2009, the Washington Capitals traded Seabrook to the Calgary Flames for future considerations. Seabrook then became a professional player with the Flames' AHL affiliate Abbotsford Heat for the 2009–10 AHL season. Seabrook remained with the Heat in the 2010–11 season until March 4, 2011, when the Heat loaned him to the Manitoba Moose, while centre MacGregor Sharp was loaned from the Moose to the Heat. On July 9, 2011, the Calgary Flames traded Seabrook to the Florida Panthers for Jordan Henry.

In September 2012, Seabrook signed his first European contract with the HC Val Pusteria Wolves in Italian Serie A for the 2012–13 season. After an initial slow start with the Wolves, Seabrook showed his acumen in contributing with 8 goals and 18 points in 18 games, before seeking a release from his contract to return home in Canada for a self-imposed time-out from hockey on November 18, 2012.

On August 22, 2014, Seabrook signalled his comeback to professional hockey in signing a one-year AHL contract with the Bridgeport Sound Tigers. He was assigned to ECHL affiliate, the Stockton Thunder to begin the 2014–15 season. Seabrook contributed with 27 points in 50 games before his AHL rights were traded by the Sound Tigers to the Rockford IceHogs, an affiliate of the Chicago Blackhawks, on March 4, 2015. Seabrook was immediately recalled from the Thunder and remained with the IceHogs for the duration of the playoffs.

== Personal ==
Seabrook's older brother, Brent played for the Chicago Blackhawks of the NHL.

== Career statistics ==
			Regular season					Playoffs
Season	Team	League	GP	G	A	Pts	PIM	GP	G	A	Pts	PIM
2003–04	Delta Ice Hawks	PIJHL	60	5	20	25	70	—	—	—	—	—
2004–05	Coquitlam Express	BCHL	58	8	20	28	70	7	1	3	4	10
2005–06	Burnaby Express	BCHL	57	10	24	34	81	20	9	10	19	20
2006–07	University of Denver	WCHA	37	2	11	13	24	—	—	—	—	—
2007–08	Calgary Hitmen	WHL	59	4	13	17	47	14	0	5	5	13
2008–09	Calgary Hitmen	WHL	64	15	40	55	58	18	4	11	15	26
2009–10	Abbotsford Heat	AHL	78	10	18	28	53	12	2	1	3	30
2010–11	Abbotsford Heat	AHL	48	4	16	20	18	—	—	—	—	—
2010–11	Manitoba Moose	AHL	15	1	2	3	8	10	2	1	3	0
2011–12	San Antonio Rampage	AHL	45	3	10	13	12	4	0	1	1	0
2011–12	Cincinnati Cyclones	ECHL	9	2	1	3	0	—	—	—	—	—
2012–13	HC Pustertal Wölfe	ITA	18	8	10	18	18	—	—	—	—	—
2014–15	Stockton Thunder	ECHL	51	7	20	27	60	—	—	—	—	—
2014–15	Rockford IceHogs	AHL	15	1	4	5	2	7	0	2	2	10
AHL totals			201	19	50	69	93	33	4	5	9	40
