= Carson McMillan =

Canadian ice hockey player

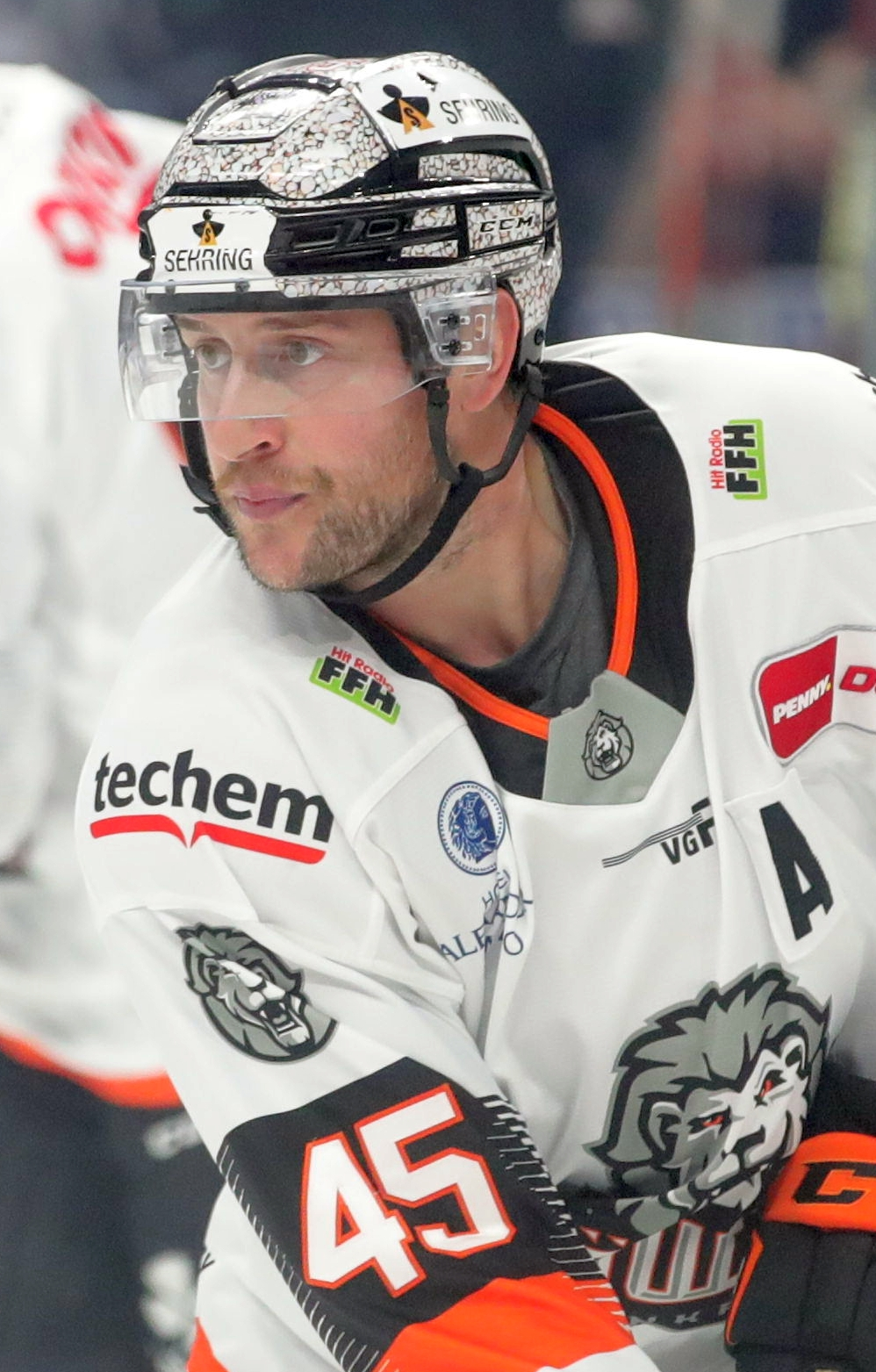
- McMillan with Löwen Frankfurt in 2022
- Born: September 10, 1988 (age 37) Brandon, Manitoba, Canada
- Height: 6 ft 1 in (185 cm)
- Weight: 197 lb (89 kg; 14 st 1 lb)
- Position: Right wing
- Shoots: Right
- DEL2 team Former teams: Kassel Huskies; Minnesota Wild; Esbjerg Energy; Fischtown Pinguins; Löwen Frankfurt
- NHL draft: 200th overall, 2007; Minnesota Wild
- Playing career: 2009–present

Carson McMillan (born September 10, 1988) is a Canadian professional ice hockey forward who is currently playing for EC Kassel Huskies of the DEL2. He was selected by the Minnesota Wild in the 7th round (200th overall) of the 2007 NHL entry draft.

== Playing career ==
McMillan made his NHL debut with the Wild on April 3, 2011 and scored a goal in his first NHL game against goaltender Jimmy Howard of the Detroit Red Wings.

In the 2014–15 season, after 13 games with the Toronto Marlies and time with ECHL affiliate, the Orlando Solar Bears, McMillan was traded to the Bridgeport Sound Tigers in exchange for Peter Sivak on February 20, 2015.

On September 29, 2015, McMillan signed as a free agent to a one-year contract in the ECHL with the Idaho Steelheads.

In his fourth year in the DEL in the 2022–23 season, McMillan helped Frankfurt in their first season in the top tier by recording 5 goals and 17 points through 55 regular season games. Following their defeat in the playoff qualifiers to Düsseldorfer EG, McMillan left Löwen Frankfurt at the conclusion of his contract on March 19, 2023.

On July 6, 2023, McMillan returned to the DEL2, signing a one-year contract with the Kassel Huskies.

== Career statistics ==
			Regular season					Playoffs
Season	Team	League	GP	G	A	Pts	PIM	GP	G	A	Pts	PIM
2004–05	Brandon Wheat Kings AAA	MMHL	40	17	19	36	34	5	3	4	7	8
2004–05	Winkler Flyers	MJHL	4	1	1	2	2	2	0	0	0	0
2005–06	Calgary Hitmen	WHL	59	3	2	5	42	13	0	0	0	2
2006–07	Calgary Hitmen	WHL	72	7	15	22	76	18	2	0	2	17
2007–08	Calgary Hitmen	WHL	72	16	26	42	87	16	1	0	1	22
2008–09	Calgary Hitmen	WHL	68	31	41	72	93	18	3	8	11	18
2009–10	Houston Aeros	AHL	56	4	4	8	70	—	—	—	—	—
2010–11	Houston Aeros	AHL	78	12	10	22	80	21	3	2	5	14
2010–11	Minnesota Wild	NHL	4	1	1	2	0	—	—	—	—	—
2011–12	Houston Aeros	AHL	51	4	8	12	43	4	0	2	2	2
2011–12	Minnesota Wild	NHL	11	1	2	3	11	—	—	—	—	—
2012–13	Houston Aeros	AHL	64	9	9	18	31	4	0	0	0	2
2013–14	Iowa Wild	AHL	68	12	16	28	36	—	—	—	—	—
2013–14	Minnesota Wild	NHL	1	0	0	0	0	—	—	—	—	—
2014–15	Orlando Solar Bears	ECHL	22	5	9	14	12	—	—	—	—	—
2014–15	Toronto Marlies	AHL	13	0	1	1	8	—	—	—	—	—
2014–15	Bridgeport Sound Tigers	AHL	21	4	2	6	4	—	—	—	—	—
2015–16	Idaho Steelheads	ECHL	70	19	15	34	40	7	1	6	7	0
2016–17	Esbjerg Energy	DEN	39	9	8	17	22	18	1	3	4	20
2017–18	Esbjerg Energy	DEN	47	24	28	52	37	14	2	5	7	2
2018–19	Fischtown Pinguins	DEL	52	8	9	17	14	3	0	0	0	0
2019–20	Fischtown Pinguins	DEL	51	6	9	15	30	—	—	—	—	—
2020–21	Fischtown Pinguins	DEL	29	5	10	15	54	3	0	0	0	2
2021–22	Löwen Frankfurt	DEL2	52	24	26	50	28	12	2	9	11	4
2022–23	Löwen Frankfurt	DEL	55	5	12	17	50	2	0	0	0	0
AHL totals			351	45	50	95	272	29	3	4	7	18
NHL totals			16	2	3	5	11	—	—	—	—	—
DEL totals			187	24	40	64	148	8	0	0	0	2
