= Andrew Clark (ice hockey) =

Canadian ice hockey player (born 1988)

- Born: April 8, 1988 (age 38) Brandon, Manitoba, Canada
- Height: 5 ft 10 in (178 cm)
- Weight: 190 lb (86 kg; 13 st 8 lb)
- Position: Left wing
- Shot: Left
- SL team: SC Langenthal
- Played for: Bridgeport Sound Tigers; Esbjerg Energy; SC Rapperswil-Jona Lakers; HC TWK Innsbruck
- NHL draft: Undrafted
- Playing career: 2013–2021

Andrew Clark (born April 8, 1988) is a Canadian former professional ice hockey player.

== Playing career ==
He played for Acadia University in the Atlantic conference of Canadian Interuniversity Sport (CIS). For his outstanding play during the 2011–12 season, Clark was selected as the 2011–12 Canadian Interuniversity Sport player of the year, and was awarded the Senator Joseph A. Sullivan Trophy.

Andrew left the Acadia University Hockey program at the end of the 2012–13 AUS Hockey season and signed a professional contract with the Stockton Thunder, an ECHL affiliate of the Edmonton Oilers. He appeared in a total of 66 ECHL contests for the Thunder until the end of the 2013–14 season with 26 goals and 43 assists. During the 2013–14 season, he also spent time in the AHL after signing a professional tryout agreement with the Bridgeport Sound Tigers in December 2013. Clark saw the ice in 35 AHL games, producing seven goals as well as twelve assists.

He moved abroad upon the conclusion of the 2013–14 campaign, joining Esbjerg Energy. Clark would lead the Danish league in scoring (36 games: 25 goals, 50 assists plus 15 games with nine goals and 16 assists in post season play) and helped the Esbjerg squad reach the finals, where they lost.

After making noise in the Danish league, he was picked up by the SC Rapperswil-Jona Lakers of Switzerland's second-tier National League B (NLB) prior to the 2015–16 campaign. He saw the ice in 39 regular season contests for the Lakers, scoring 19 goals while assisting on 28 more. On the way to the NLB finals, Clark played in 17 playoff games, tallying four goals and ten assists. The Lakers eventually fell short to HC Ajoie in the NLB finals.

He continued his way through the European leagues, signing with HC Innsbruck of the Austrian Hockey League on June 17, 2016.

== Career statistics ==
			Regular season					Playoffs
Season	Team	League	GP	G	A	Pts	PIM	GP	G	A	Pts	PIM
2004–05	Neepawa Natives	MJHL	58	19	27	46	101	—	—	—	—	—
2005–06	Brandon Wheat Kings	WHL	61	9	14	23	37	6	0	0	0	11
2006–07	Brandon Wheat Kings	WHL	72	28	32	60	66	11	4	2	6	6
2007–08	Brandon Wheat Kings	WHL	49	16	39	55	51	6	1	3	4	6
2008–09	Brandon Wheat Kings	WHL	72	40	38	78	34	12	9	5	14	12
2009–10	Acadia University	CIS	27	11	17	28	34	4	1	1	2	4
2010–11	Acadia University	CIS	28	16	16	32	14	6	2	2	4	4
2011–12	Acadia University	CIS	28	15	24	39	34	3	0	2	2	2
2012–13	Acadia University	CIS	28	14	18	32	42	7	1	4	5	2
2012–13	Stockton Thunder	ECHL	4	3	2	5	8	—	—	—	—	—
2013–14	Stockton Thunder	ECHL	31	14	21	35	15	9	2	6	8	0
2013–14	Bridgeport Sound Tigers	AHL	35	7	12	19	12	—	—	—	—	—
2014–15	Esbjerg Energy	DEN	36	25	50	75	54	15	9	16	25	20
2015–16	SC Rapperswil-Jona Lakers	NLB	39	19	28	47	34	17	4	10	14	45
2016–17	HC TWK Innsbruck	EBEL	49	23	34	57	47	4	2	1	3	14
2017–18	HC TWK Innsbruck	EBEL	54	24	35	59	33	6	1	2	3	8
2018–19	HC TWK Innsbruck	EBEL	52	20	49	69	44	—	—	—	—	—
AHL totals			35	7	12	19	12	—	—	—	—	—

== Awards and honours ==
Award	Year
CIS First-Team All-Canadian	2011–12
Senator Joseph A. Sullivan Trophy - CIS Player of the Year	2011–12
CIS Second-Team All-Canadian	2012–13
