= Štěpán Novotný =

Czech professional ice hockey winger (born 1990)

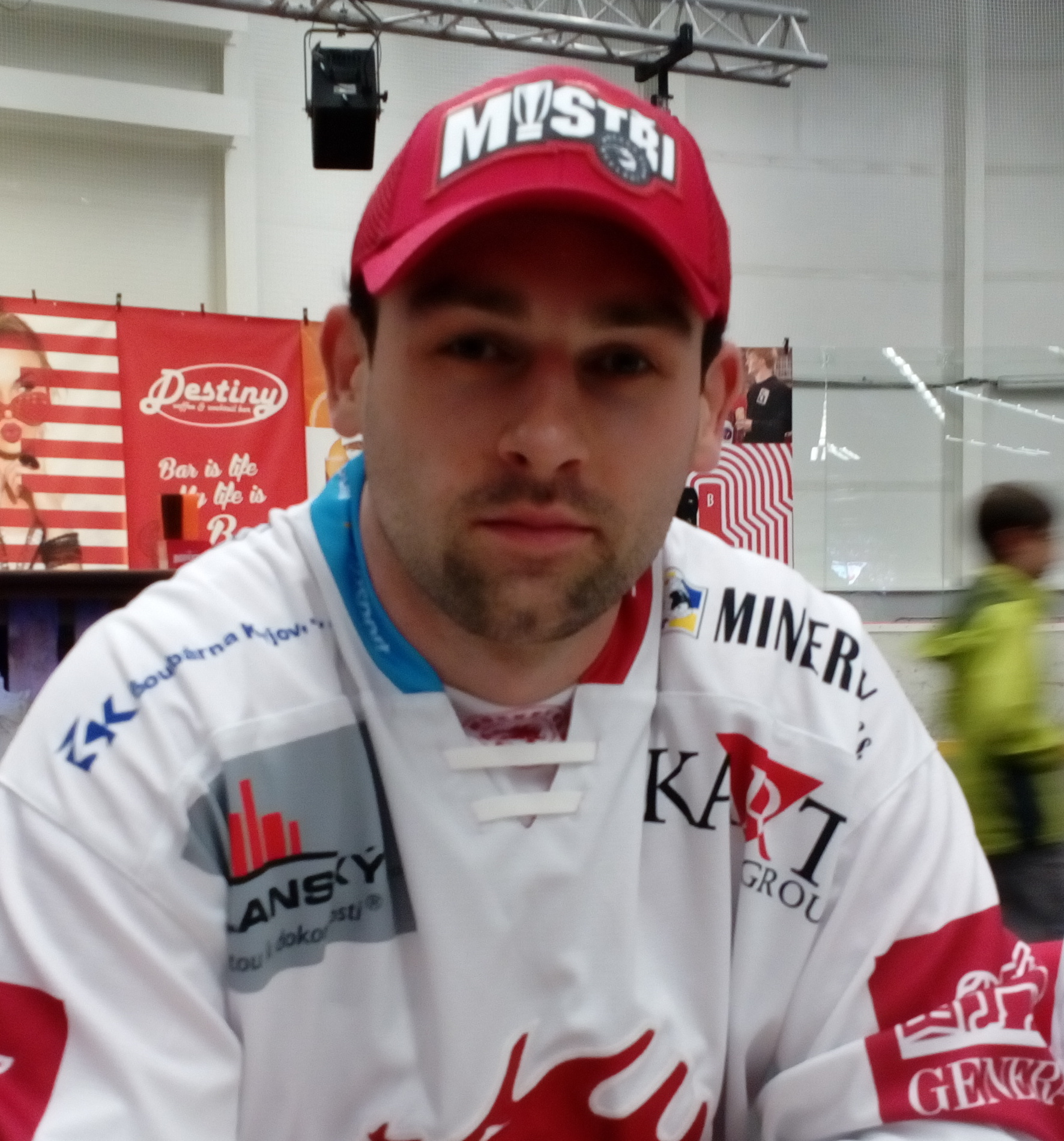
- Stepan after the end of the 18/19 season
- Born: September 21, 1990 (age 34); Prague, Czechoslovakia
- Height: 6 ft 2 in (188 cm)
- Weight: 209 lb (95 kg; 14 st 13 lb)
- Position: Right wing
- Shoots: Left
- Slovak team Former teams: MsHK Žilina; HC Lev Poprad; HC Bílí Tygři Liberec; HC Košice; HC Plzeň; HC Kometa Brno; HK Nitra; Graz 99ers
- NHL draft: Undrafted
- Playing career: 2011–present

Štěpán Novotný (born 21 September 1990) is a Czech professional ice hockey winger. He is currently playing with the MsHK Žilina of the Slovak Extraliga (Slovak). He played 34 games for Lev Poprad of the Kontinental Hockey League (KHL) during the 2011–12 season.

== Career statistics ==
			Regular season					Playoffs
Season	Team	League	GP	G	A	Pts	PIM	GP	G	A	Pts	PIM
2008–09	Indiana Ice	USHL	44	4	7	11	8	4	0	0	0	0
2008–09	Kelowna Rockets	WHL	65	19	22	41	24	22	5	1	6	4
2009–10	Kelowna Rockets	WHL	23	14	11	25	6	—	—	—	—	—
2009–10	Swift Current Broncos	WHL	43	11	20	31	18	4	1	1	2	0
2010–11	Swift Current Broncos	WHL	58	22	18	40	35	—	—	—	—	—
2011–12	HC Lev Poprad	KHL	34	5	6	11	16	—	—	—	—	—
2012–13	HC Kosice	Slovak	38	15	7	22	16	—	—	—	—	—
2012–13	HC Bili Tygri Liberec	Czech	6	0	0	0	2	—	—	—	—	—
2013–14	HC Plzen	Czech	17	3	1	4	4	—	—	—	—	—
2013–14	HC Kometa Brno	Czech	23	4	2	6	6	3	0	0	0	0
2014–15	MsHK Zilina	Slovak	39	13	9	22	22	—	—	—	—	—
2014–15	HK Nitra	Slovak	13	3	0	3	2	—	—	—	—	—
2015–16	EC Graz	Austria	2	0	0	0	0	—	—	—	—	—
2015–16	MsHK Zilina	Slovak	47	2	13	15	16	4	2	1	3	2
Czech Extraliga totals			46	7	3	10	12	3	0	0	0	0
Slovak Extraliga totals			143	35	32	67	58	21	3	6	9	6
