= Chris Langkow =

Canadian ice hockey player (born 1989)

- Born: August 22, 1989 (age 37) Vegreville, Alberta, Canada
- Height: 6 ft 0 in (183 cm)
- Weight: 176 lb (80 kg; 12 st 8 lb)
- Position: Centre
- Shoots: Right
- Slovak team Former teams: HKM Zvolen; Peoria Rivermen; Bridgeport Sound Tigers; HDD Olimpija Ljubljana; VIK Västerås HK; Hartford Wolf Pack; MAC Budapest; HC Litvínov; HC Nové Zámky
- NHL draft: Undrafted
- Playing career: 2010–present

Chris Langkow (born August 22, 1989) is a Canadian professional ice hockey center who is currently playing for HKM Zvolen of the Slovak Extraliga.

== Playing career ==
Prior to turning professional, Langkow played major junior hockey in the Western Hockey League with the Spokane Chiefs, Saskatoon Blades, and the Everett Silvertips. During the 2012–13 season, Langkow was traded by the Reading Royals to the South Carolina Stingrays on November 9, 2012.

After playing the majority of the 2013–14 season with the Bridgeport Sound Tigers, posting 20 points in 64 games, Langkow was signed to a one-year extension on May 13, 2014. In his first full AHL season with Bridgeport in 2014–15, Langkow appeared in a career high 69 games with 8 goals and 16 points.

On August 7, 2015, Langkow returned to the ECHL as a free agent, agreeing to a one-year contract with the Elmira Jackals. Following the 2015–16 season, Langkow left North America after 6 professional seasons, agreeing to his first European contract with Slovenian club, HDD Olimpija Ljubljana of the EBEL on July 24, 2016. Langkow compiled 10 goals and 28 points in 41 games with Ljubljana before leaving to join Swedish second division club, VIK Västerås HK of the HockeyAllsvenskan on January 20, 2017. He registered just 3 assists in 13 games before helping the club avoid relegation in the post-season.

Langkow returned to the ECHL as a free agent in the off-season, agreeing to a one-year deal with inaugural club, the Worcester Railers, on August 24, 2017. In the 2017–18 season, Langkow contributed offensively with 45 points in 50 games. He enjoyed a brief stint in the AHL with the Hartford Wolf Pack, notching a goal and assist in 7 games.

On June 29, 2018, Langkow returned to Europe as a free agent, securing a one-year deal with Hungarian club, MAC Budapest, for their inaugural season in the Slovak Extraliga.

== Personal ==
Chris is a first cousin to NHL veteran Daymond and Scott Langkow.

== Career statistics ==
			Regular season					Playoffs
Season	Team	League	GP	G	A	Pts	PIM	GP	G	A	Pts	PIM
2005–06	Spokane Chiefs	WHL	3	0	1	1	0	—	—	—	—	—
2006–07	Spokane Chiefs	WHL	49	4	8	12	33	2	0	0	0	0
2007–08	Spokane Chiefs	WHL	39	7	8	15	14	—	—	—	—	—
2007–08	Saskatoon Blades	WHL	32	6	12	18	6	—	—	—	—	—
2008–09	Saskatoon Blades	WHL	70	15	34	49	52	7	2	3	5	2
2009–10	Saskatoon Blades	WHL	1	0	0	0	2	—	—	—	—	—
2009–10	Everett Silvertips	WHL	69	21	38	59	60	7	2	6	8	4
2010–11	Alaska Aces	ECHL	56	15	21	36	30	13	8	3	11	6
2010–11	Peoria Rivermen	AHL	8	1	2	3	0	—	—	—	—	—
2011–12	Bridgeport Sound Tigers	AHL	7	1	4	5	2	—	—	—	—	—
2011–12	Alaska Aces	ECHL	16	3	7	10	9	10	0	1	1	2
2012–13	Reading Royals	ECHL	9	2	2	4	10	—	—	—	—	—
2012–13	South Carolina Stingrays	ECHL	46	18	19	37	28	4	0	3	3	6
2013–14	South Carolina Stingrays	ECHL	11	2	7	9	8	—	—	—	—	—
2013–14	Bridgeport Sound Tigers	AHL	64	5	15	20	24	—	—	—	—	—
2014–15	Bridgeport Sound Tigers	AHL	69	8	8	16	26	—	—	—	—	—
2015–16	Elmira Jackals	ECHL	69	13	34	47	40	—	—	—	—	—
2016–17	HDD Olimpija Ljubljana	EBEL	41	10	18	28	23	—	—	—	—	—
2016–17	VIK Västerås HK	Allsv	13	0	3	3	4	—	—	—	—	—
2017–18	Worcester Railers	ECHL	50	18	27	45	28	—	—	—	—	—
2017–18	Hartford Wolf Pack	AHL	7	1	1	2	0	—	—	—	—	—
2018–19	MAC Budapest	Slovak	55	17	22	39	77	8	6	4	10	4
2019–20	MAC Budapest	Slovak	40	23	17	40	55	—	—	—	—	—
2019–20	HC Litvínov	ELH	1	0	0	0	0	—	—	—	—	—
2020–21	Did not play
2021–22	HC Nové Zámky	Slovak	41	16	19	35	28	—	—	—	—	—
AHL totals			155	16	30	46	52	—	—	—	—	—

== Awards and honours ==
Award	Year
ECHL
All-Star Classic	2011
Kelly Cup Champion	2011
