= Joel Broda =

Canadian ice hockey player (born 1989)

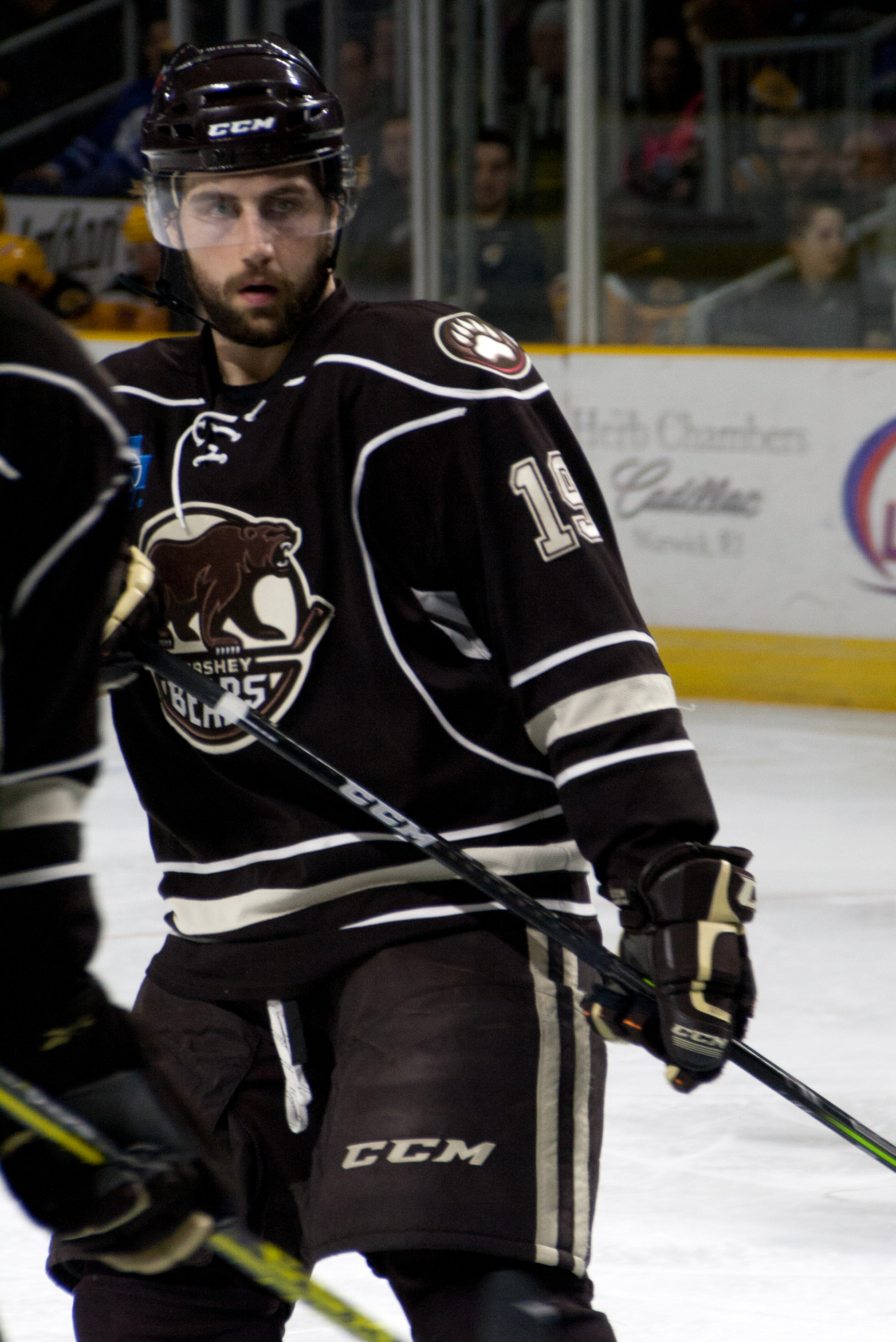
- Broda with Hershey Bears in 2015
- Born: November 24, 1989 (age 36) Yorkton, Saskatchewan, Canada
- Height: 6 ft 0 in (183 cm)
- Weight: 203 lb (92 kg; 14 st 7 lb)
- Position: Centre
- Shot: Left
- Played for: Houston Aeros; Oklahoma City Barons; Bridgeport Sound Tigers; Hershey Bears; HC Bolzano; EHC Black Wings Linz; Dornbirn Bulldogs; HC TWK Innsbruck; Graz99ers; EC VSV; Kassel Huskies
- NHL draft: 144th overall, 2008; Washington Capitals
- Playing career: 2010–2022

Joel Broda (born November 24, 1989) is a Canadian former professional ice hockey centre. He was selected by the Washington Capitals in the 5th round, 144th overall, in the 2008 NHL entry draft.

== Playing career ==
On May 7, 2010, Broda won the Ed Chynoweth Cup with the Calgary Hitmen. He scored his sole final series goal in the game 2, against his former WHL team, the Tri-City Americans.

On July 13, 2010, Broda was signed as an unrestricted free agent by the Minnesota Wild to a three-year entry-level contract, and on September 23, 2010, he was assigned to their top farm team, the Houston Aeros of the American Hockey League.

On January 19, 2011, Broda was assigned to the Wilds ECHL affiliate, the Bakersfield Condors.

On August 15, 2013, Broda returned to the Condors as a free agent, signing a one-year contract to Captain the club for the 2013–14 season. On October 15, 2013, Broda was signed to a PTO Contract with the Oklahoma City Barons of the AHL On February 19, 2014, Broda was signed to a PTO with the Bridgeport Sound Tigers of AHL. On April 1, Broda was released from PTO to return to the Bakersfield Condors to play the ECHL playoffs as team captain.

As a free agent, Broda made a return of sorts to Capitals organization, in signing a one-year AHL contract with affiliate, the Hershey Bears on August 19, 2014.

On August 29, 2015, Broda left North America as free agent in signing his first contract abroad with Italian club, HCB South Tyrol of the Austrian EBEL. He excelled as his team's leading scorer (26 goals, 22 assists in 60 games) in his first season in Europe and then penned a deal with fellow EBEL outfit EHC Linz in April 2016.

On August 14, 2020, Broda continued his career in Austria, joining his fifth club in 6 seasons by signing a one-year contract with the Graz99ers.

== Career statistics ==
| | | | Regular season | | | | | Playoffs |
| Season | Team | League | GP | G | A | Pts | PIM | GP | G | A | Pts | PIM |
|---|---|---|---|---|---|---|---|---|---|---|---|---|
| 2004–05 | Tri-City Americans | WHL | 1 | 0 | 0 | 0 | 0 | — | — | — | — | — |
| 2005–06 | Tri-City Americans | WHL | 51 | 3 | 1 | 4 | 10 | 5 | 0 | 0 | 0 | 0 |
| 2006–07 | Tri-City Americans | WHL | 71 | 16 | 28 | 44 | 62 | 6 | 2 | 0 | 2 | 0 |
| 2007–08 | Tri-City Americans | WHL | 3 | 2 | 1 | 3 | 2 | — | — | — | — | — |
| 2007–08 | Moose Jaw Warriors | WHL | 70 | 28 | 22 | 50 | 72 | 6 | 1 | 1 | 2 | 0 |
| 2008–09 | Moose Jaw Warriors | WHL | 39 | 36 | 12 | 48 | 45 | — | — | — | — | — |
| 2008–09 | Calgary Hitmen | WHL | 28 | 17 | 22 | 39 | 19 | 18 | 11 | 13 | 24 | 8 |
| 2009–10 | Calgary Hitmen | WHL | 66 | 39 | 34 | 73 | 65 | 23 | 13 | 4 | 17 | 16 |
| 2010–11 | Houston Aeros | AHL | 22 | 5 | 2 | 7 | 16 | — | — | — | — | — |
| 2010–11 | Bakersfield Condors | ECHL | 32 | 17 | 13 | 30 | 39 | 4 | 0 | 1 | 1 | 0 |
| 2011–12 | Houston Aeros | AHL | 72 | 14 | 13 | 27 | 59 | 4 | 0 | 1 | 1 | 2 |
| 2012–13 | Houston Aeros | AHL | 30 | 2 | 2 | 4 | 27 | — | — | — | — | — |
| 2012–13 | Orlando Solar Bears | ECHL | 3 | 1 | 1 | 2 | 10 | — | — | — | — | — |
| 2013–14 | Bakersfield Condors | ECHL | 41 | 21 | 19 | 40 | 47 | 16 | 8 | 4 | 12 | 10 |
| 2013–14 | Oklahoma City Barons | AHL | 8 | 1 | 1 | 2 | 8 | — | — | — | — | — |
| 2013–14 | Bridgeport Sound Tigers | AHL | 17 | 2 | 4 | 6 | 6 | — | — | — | — | — |
| 2014–15 | Hershey Bears | AHL | 53 | 7 | 3 | 10 | 52 | — | — | — | — | — |
| 2015–16 | HC Bolzano | EBEL | 54 | 23 | 21 | 44 | 44 | 6 | 3 | 1 | 4 | 0 |
| 2016–17 | EHC Black Wings Linz | EBEL | 53 | 28 | 20 | 48 | 27 | 5 | 2 | 0 | 2 | 0 |
| 2017–18 | EHC Black Wings Linz | EBEL | 54 | 20 | 27 | 47 | 26 | 12 | 4 | 6 | 10 | 12 |
| 2018–19 | Dornbirn Bulldogs | EBEL | 22 | 9 | 9 | 18 | 10 | — | — | — | — | — |
| 2019–20 | HC TWK Innsbruck | EBEL | 50 | 23 | 18 | 41 | 27 | — | — | — | — | — |
| 2020–21 | Graz99ers | ICEHL | 46 | 10 | 14 | 24 | 40 | — | — | — | — | — |
| 2021–22 | EC VSV | ICEHL | 33 | 7 | 16 | 23 | 37 | — | — | — | — | — |
| 2021–22 | Kassel Huskies | DEL2 | 12 | 2 | 7 | 9 | 12 | 1 | 0 | 0 | 0 | 2 |
| AHL totals | | | 202 | 31 | 25 | 56 | 168 | 4 | 0 | 1 | 1 | 2 |

== Awards and honours ==
| Award | Year |
|---|---|
WHL
| East Second All-Star Team | 2009 |
