= Kris Foucault =

Canadian ice hockey player (born 1990)

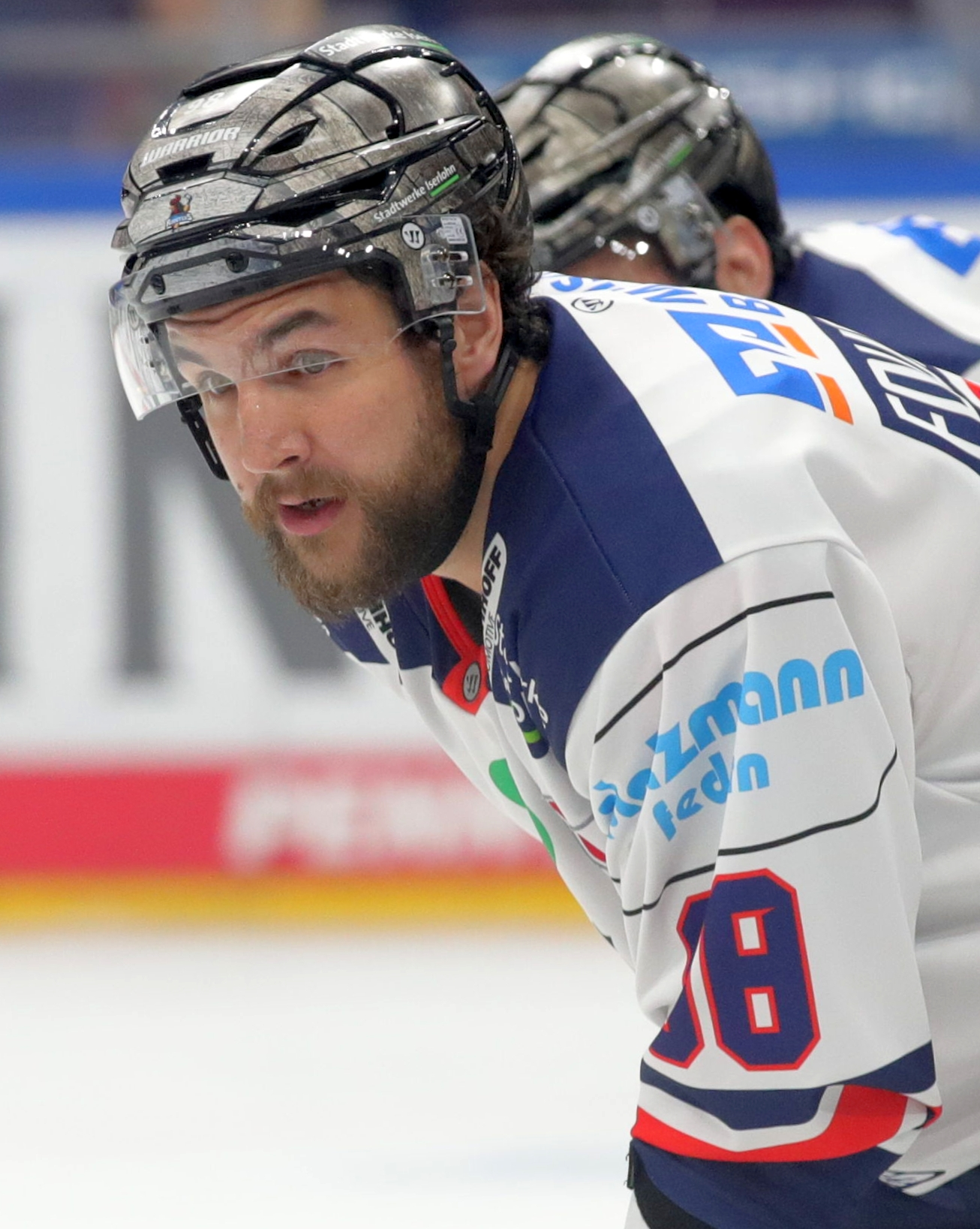
- Foucault with the Iserlohn Roosters in 2022
- Born: December 12, 1990 (age 35) Calgary, Alberta, Canada
- Height: 6 ft 1 in (185 cm)
- Weight: 203 lb (92 kg; 14 st 7 lb)
- Position: Left wing
- Shoots: Left
- team Former teams: Free Agent; Minnesota Wild; Vienna Capitals; ZSC Lions; Grizzlys Wolfsburg; ERC Ingolstadt; Eisbären Berlin; Iserlohn Roosters
- NHL draft: 103rd overall, 2009; Minnesota Wild
- Playing career: 2011–present

Kristopher Foucault (born December 12, 1990) is a Canadian professional ice hockey player. He is currently an unrestricted free agent who most recently played under contract with the Iserlohn Roosters of the Deutsche Eishockey Liga (DEL). Foucault was selected by the Minnesota Wild in the 4th round (103rd overall) of the 2009 NHL entry draft.

== Playing career ==
As a youth, Foucault played in the 2003 Quebec International Pee-Wee Hockey Tournament with the Calgary Junior Flames minor ice hockey team.

Foucault played major junior hockey in the Western Hockey League (WHL) from 2006–07 to 2010–11, collecting 56 goals and 55 assists for 111 points in 195 games. Before his WHL career he spent a season with the Canmore Eagles in the AJHL.

On May 27, 2011, the Minnesota Wild signed Foucault to a three-year entry-level deal. On February 14, 2012, Foucault made his NHL debut, to become the 13th rookie to see ice time with the Wild during their 2011–12 season. In the 2013–14 season, Foucault was assigned to AHL affiliate, the Iowa Wild. With no opportunity of a recall with Minnesota he recorded 11 goals and 22 points in 58 games with Iowa.

Foucault was not tendered a qualifying offer with the Wild and was released as a free agent in the offseason. On July 3, 2014, he signed his first European contract, on a one-year deal with Austrian club, Vienna Capitals of the EBEL. He completed the season ranked 13th in the league in scoring (54 games: 22 goals, 25 assists) and moved to Switzerland for the 2015–16 campaign: He split the season between the ZSC Lions of the top-flight National League A (NLA) and second-tier team GC Küsnacht Lions. As a member of Team Canada, Foucault won the Spengler Cup in December 2015.

In May 2016, Foucault penned a two-year deal with the Grizzlys Wolfsburg of the Deutsche Eishockey Liga (DEL) in Germany. After concluding his third season with the Grizzlys in 2018–19, Foucault opted to leave the club as a free agent on March 8, 2019.

Foucault agreed to continue in the DEL, signing a one-year deal with ERC Ingolstadt on April 15, 2019. Following a productive season with ERC, Foucault moved to Eisbären Berlin on a one-year contract on November 24, 2020.

In the 2020–21 season, Foucault playing in a top-six role continued to contribute offensively, collecting 18 goals and 30 points through 35 regular season games. He added 5 points in 9 playoff games to help Eisbären Berlin claim their eighth Championship title.

As a free agent, Foucault signed an improved contract, joining his fourth DEL club in as many seasons, agreeing to a two-year contract with the Iserlohn Roosters on May 21, 2021. In his tenure with the Roosters largely affected through repeated concussion injuries, Foucault was limited to just 19 games in the 2022–23 season. With Iserlohn missing the playoffs for the second consecutive year, Foucault left the club at the conclusion of his contract on March 10, 2023.

== Career statistics ==
			Regular season					Playoffs
Season	Team	League	GP	G	A	Pts	PIM	GP	G	A	Pts	PIM
2006–07	Swift Current Broncos	WHL	3	0	0	0	0	—	—	—	—	—
2007–08	Kootenay Ice	WHL	33	0	3	3	12	8	2	1	3	2
2008–09	Kootenay Ice	WHL	4	0	1	1	4	—	—	—	—	—
2008–09	Calgary Hitmen	WHL	22	9	7	16	12	18	11	5	16	10
2009–10	Calgary Hitmen	WHL	68	22	21	43	31	23	9	7	16	21
2010–11	Calgary Hitmen	WHL	65	25	23	48	60	—	—	—	—	—
2010–11	Houston Aeros	AHL	1	0	0	0	0	—	—	—	—	—
2011–12	Houston Aeros	AHL	70	14	18	32	44	4	1	0	1	0
2011–12	Minnesota Wild	NHL	1	0	0	0	0	—	—	—	—	—
2012–13	Houston Aeros	AHL	28	5	6	11	4	4	0	0	0	0
2013–14	Iowa Wild	AHL	58	11	11	22	35	—	—	—	—	—
2014–15	Vienna Capitals	EBEL	54	22	25	47	22	14	7	6	13	18
2015–16	GCK Lions	NLB	12	8	4	12	8	—	—	—	—	—
2015–16	ZSC Lions	NLA	16	5	2	7	4	—	—	—	—	—
2016–17	Grizzlys Wolfsburg	DEL	12	4	4	8	2	—	—	—	—	—
2017–18	Grizzlys Wolfsburg	DEL	35	18	14	32	20	5	2	1	3	0
2018–19	Grizzlys Wolfsburg	DEL	7	5	2	7	0	—	—	—	—	—
2019–20	ERC Ingolstadt	DEL	52	16	26	42	22	—	—	—	—	—
2020–21	Eisbären Berlin	DEL	35	18	12	30	24	9	1	4	5	0
2021–22	Iserlohn Roosters	DEL	24	12	16	28	20	—	—	—	—	—
2022–23	Iserlohn Roosters	DEL	19	6	12	18	8	—	—	—	—	—
NHL totals			1	0	0	0	0	—	—	—	—	—

== Awards and honors ==
Award	Year
DEL
Champion (Eisbären Berlin)	2021
