= Taylor Vause =

Canadian ice hockey player

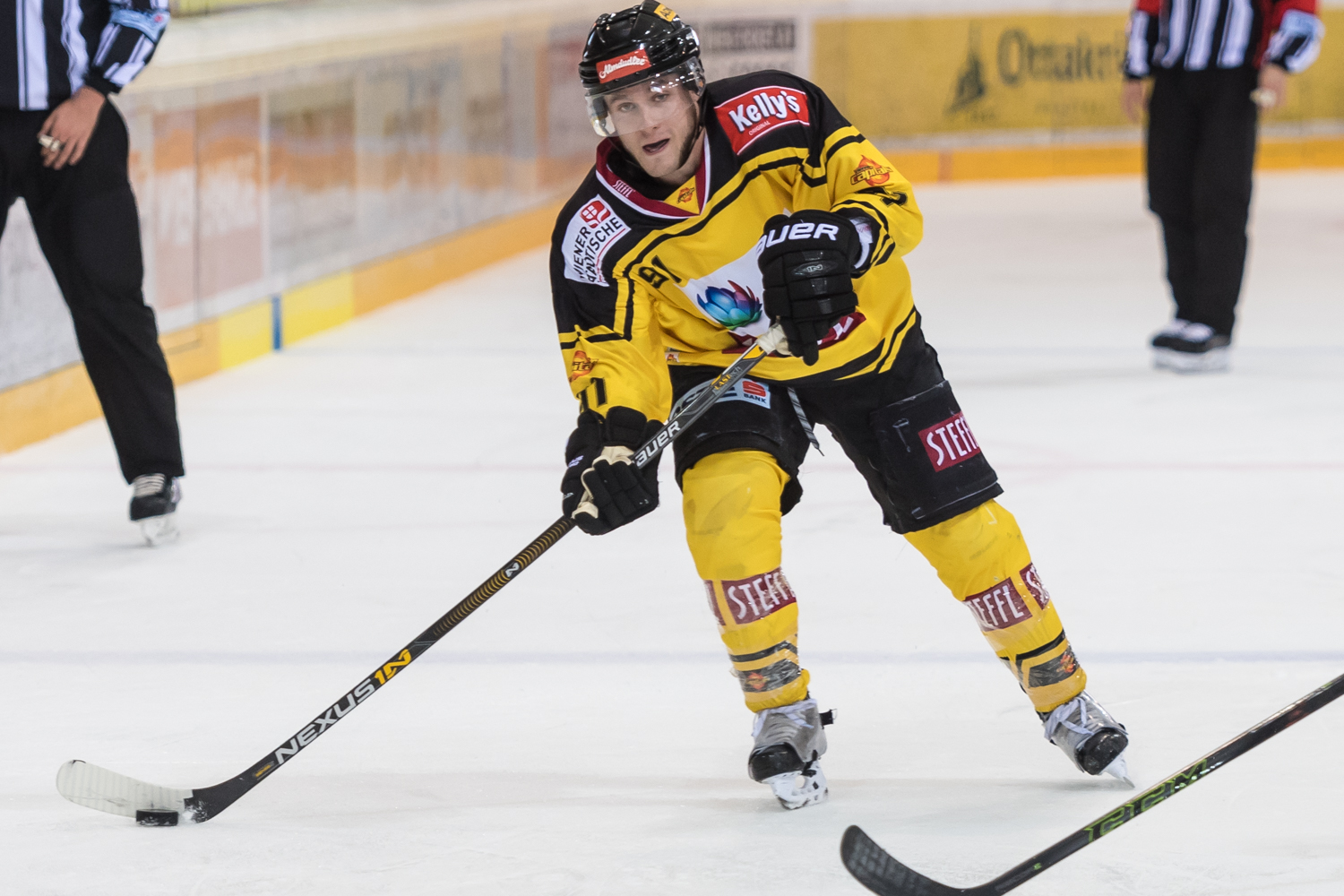
- Born: September 28, 1991 (age 34) Calgary, Alberta, Canada
- Height: 5 ft 10 in (178 cm)
- Weight: 185 lb (84 kg; 13 st 3 lb)
- Position: Forward
- Shoots: Right
- EBEL team Former teams: Vienna Capitals; Texas Stars; Adirondack Flames; HC Bolzano
- NHL draft: Undrafted
- Playing career: 2012–present

Taylor Vause (born September 28, 1991) is a Canadian professional ice hockey player. He is currently playing with the EC Bad Nauheim in the Deutsche Eishockey Liga 2 (DEL2).

== Playing career ==
Vause played major junior hockey with the Swift Current Broncos of the Western Hockey League (WHL), where he was awarded the 2011–12 Doug Wickenheiser Memorial Trophy as the WHL humanitarian of the year. He made his professional debut with the Texas Stars of the American Hockey League (AHL) near the end of the 2011–12 AHL season, and was with the Stars when they captured the 2013–14 Calder Cup as the AHL Champions.

After a season within the Calgary Flames affiliations, the Adirondack Flames and the Colorado Eagles, Vause signed his first contract abroad, agreeing to a one-year deal with Italian club, HC Bolzano of the EBEL on August 23, 2015. Upon the conclusion of the 2015–16 season, he signed a one-year deal with fellow EBEL outfit Vienna Capitals on June 1, 2016.

== Career statistics ==
			Regular season					Playoffs
Season	Team	League	GP	G	A	Pts	PIM	GP	G	A	Pts	PIM
2007–08	Calgary Royals	AMHL	35	26	23	49	8	—	—	—	—	—
2007–08	Swift Current Broncos	WHL	8	0	1	1	2	2	0	0	0	0
2008–09	Swift Current Broncos	WHL	66	10	20	30	29	7	4	1	5	4
2009–10	Swift Current Broncos	WHL	65	14	15	29	20	4	3	0	3	0
2010–11	Swift Current Broncos	WHL	62	18	29	47	8	—	—	—	—	—
2011–12	Swift Current Broncos	WHL	72	37	46	83	12	—	—	—	—	—
2011–12	Texas Stars	AHL	5	1	1	2	0	—	—	—	—	—
2012–13	Texas Stars	AHL	55	4	13	17	6	3	0	0	0	0
2013–14	Texas Stars	AHL	24	3	6	9	2	2	0	0	0	2
2013–14	Idaho Steelheads	ECHL	21	10	4	14	10	—	—	—	—	—
2014–15	Colorado Eagles	ECHL	30	20	21	41	22	4	0	4	4	0
2014–15	Adirondack Flames	AHL	41	6	8	14	4	—	—	—	—	—
2015–16	HC Bolzano	EBEL	44	14	23	37	10	6	1	4	5	2
2016–17	Vienna Capitals	EBEL	49	13	15	28	6	12	6	4	10	4
2017–18	Vienna Capitals	EBEL	53	13	25	38	6	11	3	4	7	6
2018–19	Vienna Capitals	EBEL	49	16	29	45	4	18	6	14	20	14
AHL totals			125	14	28	42	12	5	0	0	0	2

== Awards and honours ==
Award	Year
WHL
Doug Wickenheiser Memorial Trophy (Humanitarian of the Year)	2012
AHL
Calder Cup (Texas Stars)	2014
