= Tomáš Karpov =

Czech ice hockey player

- Born: 9 March 1989 (age 37) Benešov, Czechoslovakia
- Height: 5 ft 10 in (178 cm)
- Weight: 183 lb (83 kg; 13 st 1 lb)
- Position: Forward
- Shoots: Left
- Played for: Basingstoke Bison
- Playing career: 2009–present

Tomáš Karpov (born 9 March 1989) is a Czech professional ice hockey player who played for National Ice Hockey League team Basingstoke Bison. He played with HC Sparta Praha in the Czech Extraliga during the 2010–11 Czech Extraliga season. He moved to England to play with Telford Tigers in the 2012-13 EPIHL before joining up with the Bison. Between 2013 and 2016 Bison won all three EPIHL trophies (EPL Champion, EPL Play-Offs and EPL Cup). The contract with the Basingstoke Bison expired after 2016–2017 season.
