= Mark Guggenberger =

American ice hockey player

- Born: January 10, 1989 (age 36) Richfield, Minnesota, U.S.
- Height: 6 ft 3 in (191 cm)
- Weight: 207 lb (94 kg; 14 st 11 lb)
- Position: Goaltender
- Caught: Left
- Played for: Rochester Americans
- NHL draft: Undrafted
- Playing career: 2011–2016

Mark Guggenberger (born January 10, 1989) is an American former professional ice hockey goaltender.

== Early life ==
Guggenberger was born in Richfield, Minnesota. Undrafted, he played major junior hockey in the Western Hockey League with the Portland Winterhawks, Swift Current Broncos and the Kelowna Rockets before playing with his alma mater, the University of Prince Edward Island in the Canadian Interuniversity Sports.

== Career ==
On July 12, 2014, Guggenberger opted to return to the Gwinnett Gladiators for a second season in 2014–15. Guggenberger appeared in 23 games as the Gladiators back-up to Kent Patterson, before he was traded at the deadline to the Fort Wayne Komets on March 12, 2015.

After tentatively agreeing to a contract in December 2014, Guggenberger signed a one-year deal with for the 2015 season with Australian club, the Perth Thunder of the AIHL, on May 24, 2015.

== Awards and honours ==
Honours	Year
All-CHL Team (First Team All-Star)	2011–12
CHL Most Outstanding Goaltender	2011–12
CHL Rookie of the Year	2011–12
