= Lucas Bloodoff =

Canadian professional ice hockey player

- Born: May 5, 1989 (age 36) Castlegar, British Columbia, Canada
- Height: 6 ft 1 in (185 cm)
- Weight: 201 lb (91 kg; 14 st 5 lb)
- Position: Left wing
- Shot: Left
- Played for: Elmira Jackals; Adirondack Flames
- NHL draft: Undrafted
- Playing career: 2014–2015

Lucas Bloodoff (born May 5, 1989) is a Canadian former professional ice hockey player.

Undrafted Bloodoff played collegiately for Saint Mary's University in the Atlantic conference of Canadian Interuniversity Sport (CIS). For his outstanding play during the 2012–13 season, Bloodoff was selected as the 2012-13 Canadian Interuniversity Sport player of the year, and was awarded the Senator Joseph A. Sullivan Trophy. On June 18, 2014, Bloodoff embarked on his professional career by signing a one-year contract with Elmira Jackals of the ECHL.

== Family ==
His younger brother, Evan Bloodoff (born November 21, 1990), has played professional hockey in both the ECHL and American Hockey League.

== Awards and honours ==
Award	Year
CIS First-Team All-Canadian	2012–13
Senator Joseph A. Sullivan Trophy - CIS Player of the Year	2012–13
