= Mitch Versteeg =

Canadian ice hockey player

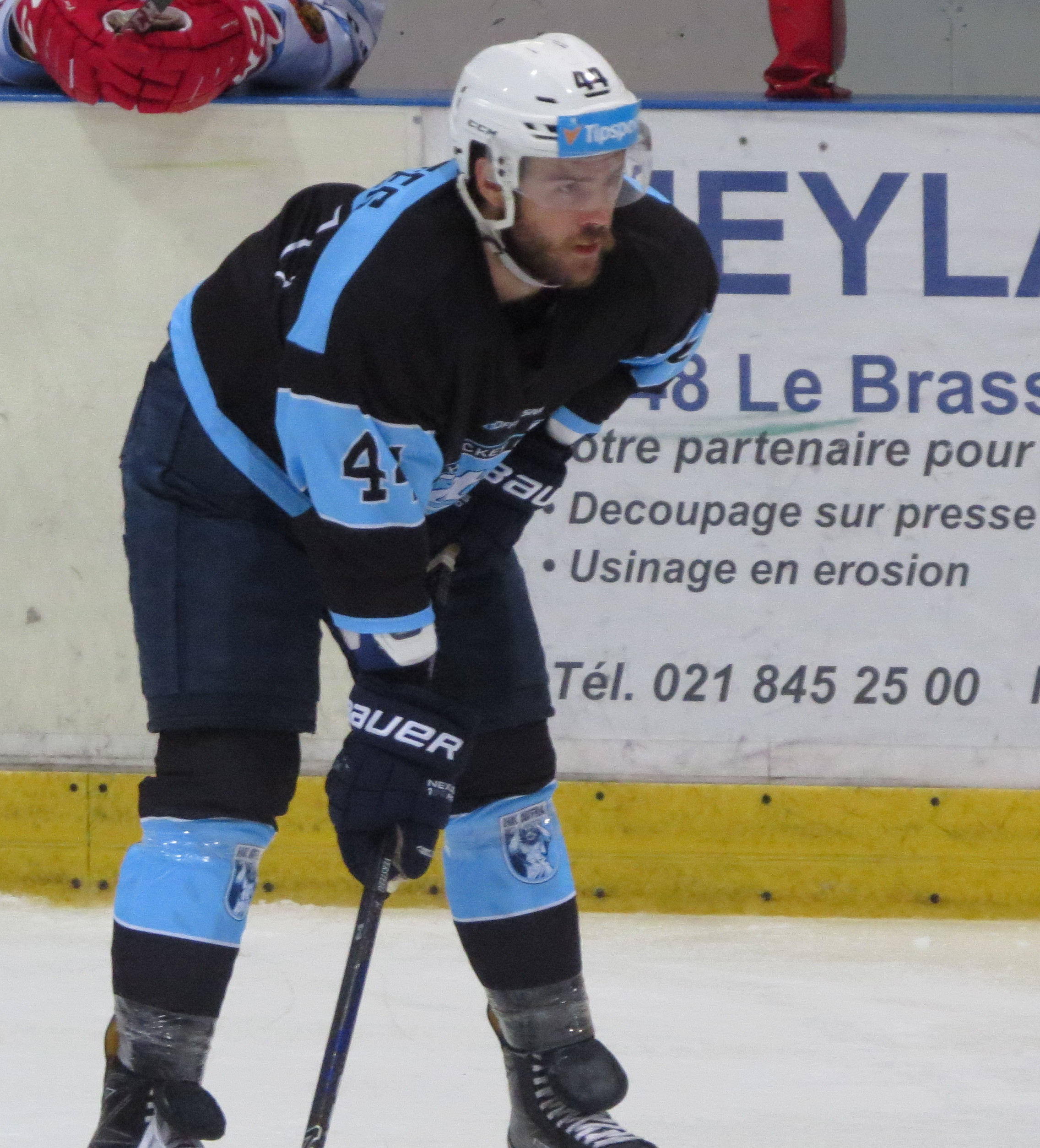
- Versteeg with HK Nitra in 2017
- Born: November 3, 1988 (age 37) Lethbridge, Alberta, Canada
- Height: 6 ft 1 in (185 cm)
- Weight: 197 lb (89 kg; 14 st 1 lb)
- Position: Defence
- Shot: Right
- Played for: Worcester Sharks; Heilbronner Falken; EC Bad Nauheim; ESV Kaufbeuren; HK Nitra; Ferencvárosi TC; Idaho Steelheads; Kalamazoo Wings; Trenton Titans; Nikkō Ice Bucks
- NHL draft: Undrafted
- Playing career: 2009–2022

Mitch Versteeg (born November 3, 1988) is a Canadian former professional ice hockey defenceman.

== Playing career ==
Versteeg played major junior hockey with the Lethbridge Hurricanes of the Western Hockey League, scoring 12 goals and 29 assists for 41 points, and earning 297 penalty minutes, in 148 games played.

Versteeg began his professional career with the 2009–10 season, playing the majority of the season in the ECHL with the Kalamazoo Wings, but also playing three games in the American Hockey League with the Worcester Sharks. He was a member of 2010–11 Kalamazoo Wings Eastern Conference Championship team.

On July 25, 2013, the Heilbronner Falken of Germany's of the 2nd Bundesliga signed Versteeg for the 2013–14 season. In August 2014, Versteeg signed a contract with the Nikkō Ice Bucks of the ALH.

After 8 seasons abroad, Versteeg opted to return to North America, agreeing to a contract for the 2021–22 season with the Idaho Steelheads of the ECHL on November 10, 2021.

== Family ==
He is the younger brother of two-time Stanley Cup champion Kris Versteeg.
