= Colin Long (ice hockey) =

American ice hockey player (born 1989)

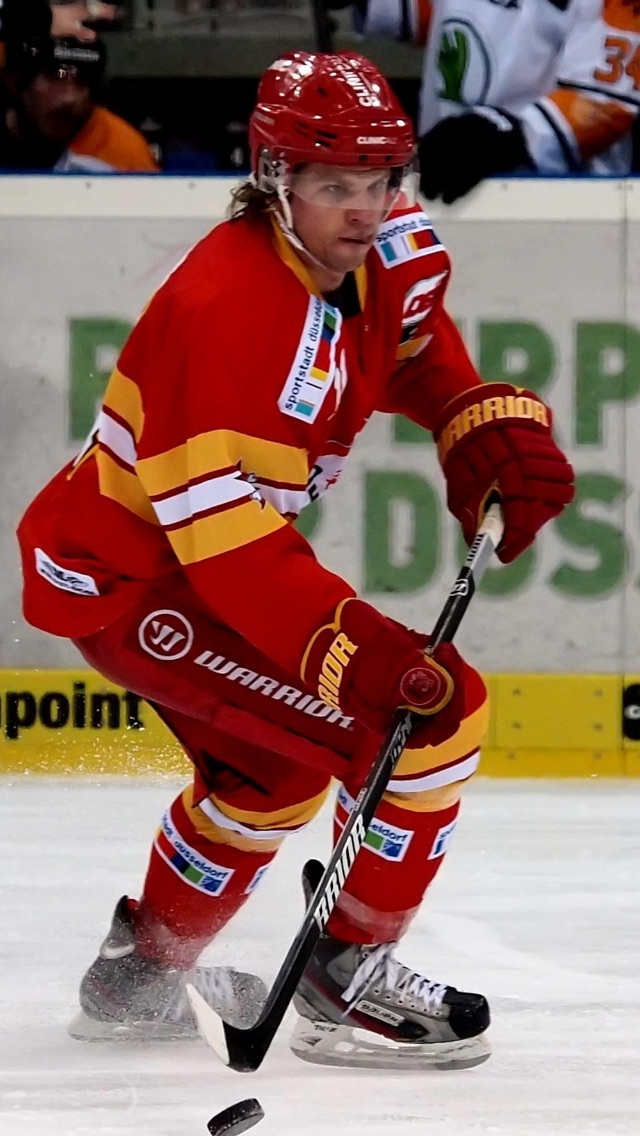
- Colin Long (2013)
- Born: June 19, 1989 (age 37) Santa Ana, California, U.S.
- Height: 5 ft 11 in (180 cm)
- Weight: 190 lb (86 kg; 13 st 8 lb)
- Position: Center
- Shoots: Right
- ECHL team Former teams: Adirondack Thunder; San Antonio Rampage; Portland Pirates; Düsseldorfer EG; Krefeld Pinguine; Asplöven HC; Asiago Hockey 1935; HC Gherdëina; EHC Lustenau
- NHL draft: 99th overall, 2008; Phoenix Coyotes
- Playing career: 2009–present

Colin Long (born June 19, 1989) is an American professional ice hockey center who is currently playing for the Adirondack Thunder in the ECHL. He was drafted by the Phoenix Coyotes in the fourth round of the 2008 NHL entry draft, 99th overall.

== Playing career ==
Long began his major junior career with the Kelowna Rockets of the WHL in 2005–06. After a 31-goal, 100-point campaign in his third season with the Rockets in 2007–08, he was named to the WHL East First All-Star Team. In the off-season, he was drafted by the Phoenix Coyotes in the fourth round, 99th overall, in the 2008 NHL entry draft. Late in his fourth season with the Rockets, he was named WHL Player of the Week on March 9, 2009, after recording 7 points in 3 games. Long was named captain for the Kelowna Rockets for the 2008-2009 Season and led them to winning the WHL championship.

Prior to the 2009–10 season, Long turned professional by signing a three-year entry-level contract with the Phoenix Coyotes on October 1, 2009, worth $700,000 per year. He was then assigned to AHL affiliate, the San Antonio Rampage, recording only four points in 29 games before suffering a season-ending head injury in January.

After three injury affected seasons within the Coyotes organization, Long was not tendered a new contract and signed a one-year deal with Düsseldorfer EG of the Deutsche Eishockey Liga on June 20, 2012. Having not recovered from injury, he became a player-coach for DEG until medically cleared to play. After being medically cleared to play, Long proceeded to suit up for Düsseldorfer EG until 2014. On April 4, Long signed a 2-year Contract with the Krefeld Pinguine of the Deutsche Eishockey Liga. After one season with the Pinguine, Long left Krefeld and signed in Allsvenskan League in Sweden with Asplöven HC on July 14, 2015. After recording 21 points in 40 games, Long signed for Asiago Hockey 1935 of the Alps Hockey League on August 1, 2016, recording 42 points in just 29 games. Long then went on to play for HC Gherdëina of the Alps Hockey League for 2 seasons. On May 22, 2019, Long signed with EHC Lustenau of the Alps Hockey League.

After a lone season continuing in the AlpsHL with EHC Lustenau, Long returned to North American after 8 European seasons and sat out the pandemic shortened 2020–21 season. On July 16, 2021, Long returned to the professional circuit in signing a one-year contract with the ECHL with the Adirondack Thunder.

== Career statistics ==
			Regular season					Playoffs
Season	Team	League	GP	G	A	Pts	PIM	GP	G	A	Pts	PIM
2005–06	Kelowna Rockets	WHL	20	1	3	4	6	3	0	0	0	0
2006–07	Kelowna Rockets	WHL	69	11	17	28	38	—	—	—	—	—
2007–08	Kelowna Rockets	WHL	72	31	69	100	41	7	2	10	12	6
2008–09	Kelowna Rockets	WHL	68	33	58	91	28	22	4	12	16	16
2009–10	San Antonio Rampage	AHL	29	2	2	4	10	—	—	—	—	—
2010–11	Las Vegas Wranglers	ECHL	50	16	21	37	12	5	0	2	2	4
2010–11	San Antonio Rampage	AHL	5	0	0	0	0	—	—	—	—	—
2011–12	Portland Pirates	AHL	19	3	5	8	4	—	—	—	—	—
2012–13	Düsseldorfer EG	DEL	15	8	9	17	8	—	—	—	—	—
2013–14	Düsseldorfer EG	DEL	39	8	23	31	41	—	—	—	—	—
2014–15	Krefeld Pinguine	DEL	30	7	6	13	12	—	—	—	—	—
2015–16	Asplöven HC	Allsv	40	7	14	21	44	—	—	—	—	—
2016–17	Asiago Hockey 1935	AlpsHL	29	10	32	42	38	11	3	8	11	13
2017–18	HC Gherdëina	AlpsHL	11	4	11	15	8	—	—	—	—	—
2018–19	HC Gherdëina	AlpsHL	39	12	24	36	32	2	1	0	1	0
2019–20	EHC Lustenau	AlpsHL	29	12	22	34	4	—	—	—	—	—
2021–22	Adirondack Thunder	ECHL	33	5	16	21	10	—	—	—	—	—
2022–23	Adirondack Thunder	ECHL	44	9	20	29	18	4	0	1	1	6
AHL totals			53	5	7	12	14	—	—	—	—	—

== Awards and honors ==
Award	Year
WHL	
West First All-Star Team	2008
West Second All-Star Team	2009
Western Hockey League Champion	2009
