= 2003–04 WHL season =

Junior ice hockey season

- League: Western Hockey League
- Sport: Ice hockey
- Teams: 20

Regular season
- Scotty Munro Memorial Trophy: Kelowna Rockets (2)
- Season MVP: Cam Ward (Red Deer Rebels)
- Top scorer: Tyler Redenbach (Swift Current Broncos)

Playoffs
- Playoffs MVP: Kevin Nastiuk (Tigers)
- Finals champions: Medicine Hat Tigers (4)
- Runners-up: Everett Silvertips

WHL seasons
- 2002–03 2004–05

2003–04 CHL season
- League: Canadian Hockey League
- Sport: Ice hockey
- Duration: OHL; September 17, 2003 – March 14, 2004; QMJHL; September 11, 2003 – March 14, 2004; WHL; September 19, 2003 – March 14, 2004
- Teams: 56
- Season MVP: Sidney Crosby (Rimouski Océanic) (QMJHL)
- Top scorer: Sidney Crosby (Rimouski Océanic) (QMJHL)

Memorial Cup
- Finals champions: Kelowna Rockets (WHL) (1st title)
- Runners-up: Gatineau Olympiques (QMJHL)

The 2003–04 WHL season was the 38th season of the Western Hockey League (WHL). Twenty teams completed a 72-game season. The defending champion Kelowna Rockets won their second consecutive Scotty Munro Memorial Trophy for the best regular season record; however, they failed to defend their playoff title as the Medicine Hat Tigers won the President's Cup, their fourth in team history, defeating the expansion Everett Silvertips in the championship series. This gave Medicine Hat a berth in the 2004 Memorial Cup tournament, which, because it was hosted by Kelowna, also featured the Rockets, who went on to win the tournament.

== League notes ==
- The Everett Silvertips joined the WHL as its 20th franchise, playing in the U.S. Division of the Western Conference. The Silvertips went on to post an historic inaugural season, breaking 10 junior hockey expansion team records. This included winning both a division title and conference title, winning a playoff series against the league's top regular season team, and becoming the first junior hockey expansion team to win a conference championship.
- The playoff format was simplified so that the top four teams in each division qualified for the playoffs, eliminating the possibility of cross-overs between divisions.

== Regular season ==
Map of WHL, 2003–04 to 2005–06
East Division
Central Division
BC Division
US Division

=== Final standings ===
==== Eastern Conference ====
East Division
Pos	Team	Pld	W	L	T	OTL	GF	GA	Pts
1	x – Moose Jaw Warriors	72	41	22	8	1	209	172	91
2	x – Prince Albert Raiders	72	38	23	6	5	215	186	87
3	x – Brandon Wheat Kings	72	28	32	9	3	230	224	68
4	x – Regina Pats	72	24	37	7	4	155	232	59
5	Saskatoon Blades	72	7	52	11	2	140	279	27

x – qualified for playoffs

Central Division
Pos	Team	Pld	W	L	T	OTL	GF	GA	Pts
1	x – Medicine Hat Tigers	72	40	20	9	3	277	216	92
2	x – Red Deer Rebels	72	35	22	10	5	167	169	85
3	x – Calgary Hitmen	72	34	24	8	6	220	187	82
4	x – Swift Current Broncos	72	36	29	7	0	234	209	79
5	Lethbridge Hurricanes	72	27	28	10	7	196	203	71

x – qualified for playoffs

==== Western Conference ====
B.C. Division
Pos	Team	Pld	W	L	T	OTL	GF	GA	Pts
1	x – Kelowna Rockets	72	47	21	4	0	185	125	98
2	x – Vancouver Giants	72	33	24	9	6	215	196	81
3	x – Kamloops Blazers	72	34	28	8	2	192	192	78
4	x – Kootenay Ice	72	32	30	7	3	183	200	74
5	Prince George Cougars	72	30	34	7	1	214	236	68

x – qualified for playoffs

U.S. Division
Pos	Team	Pld	W	L	T	OTL	GF	GA	Pts
1	x – Everett Silvertips	72	35	27	8	2	157	153	80
2	x – Portland Winter Hawks	72	34	29	6	3	199	206	77
3	x – Tri-City Americans	72	31	27	10	4	199	206	76
4	x – Spokane Chiefs	72	32	29	4	7	200	215	75
5	Seattle Thunderbirds	72	24	31	8	9	192	198	65

x – qualified for playoffs

=== Scoring leaders ===
Note: GP = Games played; G = Goals; A = Assists; Pts = Points; PIM = Penalties in minutes

Player	Team	GP	G	A	Pts	PIM
Tyler Redenbach	Swift Current Broncos	71	31	74	105	52
Jeremy Williams	Swift Current Broncos	68	52	49	101	82
Kyle Brodziak	Moose Jaw Warriors	70	39	54	93	58
Brad Schell	Spokane Chiefs	71	35	57	92	47
Chris St. Jaques	Medicine Hat Tigers	64	33	59	92	80
Chad Klassen	Spokane Chiefs	72	35	56	91	67
Seth Leonard	Prince Albert Raiders	72	50	40	90	53
Eric Fehr	Brandon Wheat Kings	71	40	34	84	129
Adam Courchaine	Vancouver Giants	70	39	43	82	34
Darren Reid	Medicine Hat Tigers	67	33	48	81	194

=== Leading goaltenders ===
Note: GP = Games played; Min = Minutes played; W = Wins; L = Losses; T = Ties; GA = Goals against; SO = Total shutouts; SV% = Save percentage; GAA = Goals against average

Player	Team	GP	Min	W	L	T	GA	SO	SV%	GAA
Kelly Guard	Kelowna Rockets	62	3651	44	14	4	95	13	.925	1.56
Jeff Harvey	Everett Silvertips	48	2684	24	15	5	89	3	.925	1.99
Cam Ward	Red Deer Rebels	56	3338	31	16	8	114	4	.926	2.05
Mike Brodeur	Moose Jaw Warriors	41	2385	23	12	5	84	4	.929	2.11
Michael Wall	Prince George/Everett	36	1716	12	13	3	65	2	.920	2.27

== 2004 WHL Playoffs ==
Conference Quarter-finals	Conference Semi-finals
E1	Moose Jaw	4
E4	Regina	0
C1	Medicine Hat	4
E3	Brandon	1
E2	Prince Albert	2
E3	Brandon	4
Eastern
C1	Medicine Hat	4
C4	Swift Current	1
E1	Moose Jaw	2
C2	Red Deer	4
C2	Red Deer	4
C3	Calgary	3
B1	Kelowna	4
B4	Kootenay	0
B1	Kelowna	4
U3	Tri-City	2
B2	Vancouver	4
B3	Kamloops	1
Western
U1	Everett	4
U4	Spokane	0
U1	Everett	4
B2	Vancouver	2
U2	Portland	1
U3	Tri-City	4

Conference Finals
C1	Medicine Hat	4
C2	Red Deer	2
U1	Everett	4
B1	Kelowna	3

WHL Championship
C1	Medicine Hat	4
U1	Everett	0

=== Conference quarterfinals ===
==== (E1) Moose Jaw Warriors vs. (E4) Regina Pats ====
March 19	Moose Jaw Warriors	3 – 0	Regina Pats	Moose Jaw Civic Centre
14:22 - Ashton Rome (1)		First period	No scoring
7:34 - sh - Tomáš Fleischmann (1); 14:55 - Masi Marjamäki (1)		Second period	No scoring
No scoring		Third period	No scoring
Mike Brodeur (19 saves / 19 shots)		Goalie stats	Dustin Slade (35 saves / 38 shots); Nick Olynyk (1 save / 1 shot)

March 20	Moose Jaw Warriors	4 – 2	Regina Pats	Moose Jaw Civic Centre

March 23	Regina Pats	1 – 5	Moose Jaw Warriors	Brandt Centre

April 13	Regina Pats	1 – 4	Moose Jaw Warriors	Brandt Centre

Moose Jaw wins series 4 – 0

==== (E2) Prince Albert Raiders vs. (E3) Brandon Wheat Kings ====
March 18	Prince Albert Raiders	2 – 3	OT	Brandon Wheat Kings	Art Hauser Centre
No scoring		First period		No scoring
10:06 - Jeremy Colliton (1); 11:07 - Justin Cruse (1)		Second period		No scoring
No scoring		Third period		Tyler Boldt (1) - 13:46; Mark Shefchyk (1) - 16:46
No scoring		First overtime period		Erik Christensen (1) - pp - 1:47
Réjean Beauchemin (23 saves / 26 shots)		Goalie stats		Josh Harding (27 saves / 29 shots)

March 19	Prince Albert Raiders	5 – 1	Brandon Wheat Kings	Art Hauser Centre

March 23	Brandon Wheat Kings	3 – 1	Prince Albert Raiders	Keystone Centre

March 24	Brandon Wheat Kings	3 – 2	Prince Albert Raiders	Keystone Centre

March 26	Prince Albert Raiders	6 – 2	Brandon Wheat Kings	Art Hauser Centre

March 29	Brandon Wheat Kings	4 – 1	Prince Albert Raiders	Keystone Centre

Brandon wins series 4 – 2

* Note: Game 6 was played at MTS Centre in Winnipeg.

==== (C1) Medicine Hat Tigers vs. (C4) Swift Current Broncos ====
March 19	Medicine Hat Tigers	3 – 0	Swift Current Broncos	Medicine Hat Arena
9:35 - Kris Russell (1)		First period	No scoring
No scoring		Second period	No scoring
4:38 - Chris St. Jacques (1); 10:58 - pp - Clarke MacArthur (1)		Third period	No scoring
Kevin Nastiuk (29 saves / 29 shots)		Goalie stats	Blake Grenier (26 saves / 29 shots)

March 20	Medicine Hat Tigers	4 – 2	Swift Current Broncos	Medicine Hat Arena

March 23	Swift Current Broncos	4 – 2	Medicine Hat Tigers	InnovationPlex

March 24	Swift Current Broncos	2 – 4	Medicine Hat Tigers	InnovationPlex

March 26	Medicine Hat Tigers	8 – 0	Swift Current Broncos	Medicine Hat Arena

Medicine Hat wins series 4 – 1

==== (C2) Red Deer Rebels vs. (C3) Calgary Hitmen ====
March 19	Red Deer Rebels	4 – 0	Calgary Hitmen	Marchant Crane Centrium
14:31 - Joel Henituik (1)		First period	No scoring
13:10 - Ladislav Kouba (1); 15:47 - pp - Colin Fraser (1)		Second period	No scoring
0:38 - pp - Shay Stephenson (1)		Third period	No scoring
Cam Ward (37 saves / 37 shots)		Goalie stats	Barry Brust (28 saves / 32 shots)

March 20	Red Deer Rebels	4 – 3	2OT	Calgary Hitmen	Marchant Crane Centrium

March 23	Calgary Hitmen	2 – 0	Red Deer Rebels	Scotiabank Saddledome

March 25	Calgary Hitmen	1 – 4	Red Deer Rebels	Scotiabank Saddledome

March 27	Red Deer Rebels	1 – 3	Calgary Hitmen	Marchant Crane Centrium

March 30	Calgary Hitmen	3 – 0	Red Deer Rebels	Scotiabank Saddledome

March 31	Red Deer Rebels	4 – 2	Calgary Hitmen	Marchant Crane Centrium

Red Deer wins series 4 – 3

=== Western Conference ===
==== (B1) Kelowna Rockets vs. (B4) Swift Current Broncos ====
March 19	Kelowna Rockets	5 – 3	Kootenay Ice	Prospera Place
7:24 - Randall Gelech (1)		First period	Dale Mahovsky (1) - 10:12; Adam Cracknell (1) - pp - 17:59
No scoring		Second period	Brad Cole (1) - 14:18
2:48 - Blake Comeau (1); 5:53 - Blake Comeau (2); 11:56 - pp - Randall Gelech (2); 19:55 - en - Blake Comeau (3)		Third period	No scoring
Kelly Guard (15 saves / 18 shots)		Goalie stats	Jeff Glass (24 saves / 28 shots)

March 20	Kelowna Rockets	4 – 1	Kootenay Ice	Prospera Place
No scoring		First period	Nigel Dawes (1) - 19:20
8:32 - pp - Randall Gelech (3); 10:34 - pp - Justin Keller (1); 13:23 - pp - Cam Paddock (1)		Second period	No scoring
18:05 - Tyler Spurgeon (1)		Third period	No scoring
Kelly Guard (10 saves / 11 shots)		Goalie stats	Jeff Glass (29 saves / 33 shots)

March 23	Kootenay Ice	0 – 4	Kelowna Rockets	Cranbrook Recreational Complex
No scoring		First period	Tyler Mosienko (1) - 3:55; Josh Gorges (1) - pp - 14:39
No scoring		Second period	Randall Gelech (4) - 6:43; Randall Gelech (5) - 18:43
No scoring		Third period	No scoring
Jeff Glass (23 saves / 27 shots)		Goalie stats	Kelly Guard (23 saves / 23 shots)

March 24	Kootenay Ice	1 – 3	Kelowna Rockets	Cranbrook Recreational Complex
No scoring		First period	No scoring
18:45 - Igor Agarunov (1)		Second period	Tyler Mosienko (2) - 4:32
No scoring		Third period	Shea Weber (1) - 7:34; Randall Gelech (6) - en - 19:34
Jeff Glass (25 saves / 27 shots)		Goalie stats	Kelly Guard (23 saves / 24 shots)

Kelowna wins series 4 – 0

==== (B2) Vancouver Giants vs. (B5) Kamloops Blazers ====
March 19	Vancouver Giants	1 – 2	Kamloops Blazers	Pacific Coliseum
4:53 - Triston Grant (1)		First period	No scoring
No scoring		Second period	Reid Jorgensen (1) - 11:13
No scoring		Third period	Jarret Lukin (1) - 4:27
Aaron Sorochan (26 saves / 28 shots)		Goalie stats	Devan Dubnyk (18 saves / 19 shots)

March 20	Vancouver Giants	4 – 2	Kamloops Blazers	Pacific Coliseum
7:46 - pp - Ty Morris (1); 8:18 - Mitch Bartley (1)		First period	No scoring
13:16 - Ty Morris (2)		Second period	Jonas Johansson (1) - sh - 9:32
12:02 - Adam Courchaine (1)		Third period	Rick Kozak (1) - pp - 14:44
Aaron Sorochan (31 saves / 33 shots)		Goalie stats	Devan Dubnyk (25 saves / 29 shots)

March 23	Kamloops Blazers	1 – 2	Vancouver Giants	Interior Savings Centre

March 24	Kamloops Blazers	3 – 5	Vancouver Giants	Interior Savings Centre

March 27	Vancouver Giants	5 – 4	OT	Kamloops Blazers	Pacific Coliseum

Vancouver wins series 4 – 1

==== (U1) Everett Silvertips vs. (U4) Spokane Chiefs ====
March 19	Everett Silvertips	2 – 1	OT	Spokane Chiefs	Everett Events Center
No scoring		First period		No scoring
No scoring		Second period		No scoring
18:14 - John Dahl (1)		Third period		Doug Auchenberg (1) - 13:49
1:07 - pp - Barry Horman (1)		First overtime period		No scoring
Jeff Harvey (28 saves / 29 shots)		Goalie stats		Jim Watt (26 saves / 28 shots)

March 20	Everett Silvertips	3 – 0	Spokane Chiefs	Everett Events Center
No scoring		First period	No scoring
15:06 - Chad Bassen (1)		Second period	No scoring
15:33 - Chad Bassen (2); 19:40 - en - Marc Desloges (1)		Third period	No scoring
Jeff Harvey (22 saves / 22 shots)		Goalie stats	Jim Watt (25 saves / 27 shots)

March 23	Spokane Chiefs	4 – 5	OT	Everett Silvertips	Numerica Veterans Arena
17:47 - pp - Derek Ryan (1)		First period		Mark Kress (1) - 3:51; Marc Desloges (2) - 5:20; Cody Thoring (1) - 9:49
No scoring		Second period		Riley Armstrong (1) - pp - 18:11
1:22 - Ned Lukačević (1); 8:35 - Brad Schell (1); 15:38 - pp - Jeff Lucky (1)		Third period		No scoring
No scoring		First overtime period		Zach Hamill (1) - 2:26
Jim Watt (17 saves / 22 shots)		Goalie stats		Jeff Harvey (43 saves / 47 shots)

March 24	Spokane Chiefs	0 – 3	Everett Silvertips	Numerica Veterans Arena
No scoring		First period	No scoring
No scoring		Second period	No scoring
No scoring		Third period	Bryan Nathe (1) - 0:55; Chad Bassen (3) - 16:02; Marc Desloges (3) - en - 19:08
Jim Watt (19 saves / 21 shots)		Goalie stats	Jeff Harvey (34 saves / 34 shots)

Everett wins series 4 – 0

==== (U2) Portland Winterhawks vs. (U3) Tri-City Americans ====
March 19	Portland Winterhawks	2 – 4	Tri-City Americans	Moda Center
3:15 - Robin Big Snake (1)		First period	Matt Schneider (1) - 1:29; Jason Beeman (1) - 8:54
15:11 - Robin Big Snake (2)		Second period	Marc Connors (1) - 3:15; Ryan Kinasewich (1) - 7:24
No scoring		Third period	No scoring
Krister Toews (33 saves / 37 shots)		Goalie stats	Carey Price (24 saves / 26 shots)

March 21	Portland Winterhawks	2 – 1	2OT	Tri-City Americans	Moda Center
1:12 - Cody McLeod (1)		First period		No scoring
No scoring		Second period		Ryan Kinasewich (2) - 1:04
No scoring		Third period		No scoring
5:39 - Brian Woolger (1)		Second overtime period		No scoring
Krister Toews (39 saves / 40 shots)		Goalie stats		Carey Price (31 saves / 33 shots)

March 23	Tri-City Americans	4 – 1	Portland Winterhawks	Toyota Center
19:11 - Shawn Belle (1); 19:47 - Ryan Kinasewich (3)		First period	No scoring
3:41 - pp - Dylan Stanley (1); 6:27 - Matt Schneider (2)		Second period	Derek Poplawski (1) - 19:31
No scoring		Third period	No scoring
Carey Price (27 saves / 28 shots)		Goalie stats	Krister Toews (21 saves / 25 shots)

March 24	Tri-City Americans	3 – 2	Portland Winterhawks	Toyota Center
11:58 - Marcus Jonasen (1); 16:14 - Clayton Stoner (1)		First period	No scoring
No scoring		Second period	Darrell May (1) - 17:15
7:59 - pp - Shawn Belle (2)		Third period	Cody McLeod (2) - 16:26
Carey Price (22 saves / 24 shots)		Goalie stats	Krister Toews (30 saves / 33 shots)

March 26	Portland Winterhawks	1 – 3	Tri-City Americans	Moda Center
9:03 - Brendan Mikkelson (1)		First period	Nikita Korovkin (1) - pp - 15:55
No scoring		Second period	No scoring
No scoring		Third period	Brett Festerling (1) - 17:24; Ryan Costanzo (1) - en - 18:36
Krister Toews (24 saves / 26 shots)		Goalie stats	Carey Price (17 saves / 18 shots)

Tri-City wins series 4 – 1

=== Conference semifinals ===
==== (C1) Medicine Hat Tigers vs. (E3) Brandon Wheat Kings ====
April 2	Medicine Hat Tigers	5 – 1	Brandon Wheat Kings	Medicine Hat Arena

April 3	Medicine Hat Tigers	4 – 2	Brandon Wheat Kings	Medicine Hat Arena

April 6	Brandon Wheat Kings	3 – 5	Medicine Hat Tigers	Keystone Centre

April 7	Brandon Wheat Kings	9 – 3	Medicine Hat Tigers	Keystone Centre

April 9	Medicine Hat Tigers	4 – 1	Brandon Wheat Kings	Medicine Hat Arena

Medicine Hat wins series 4 – 1

==== (E1) Moose Jaw Warriors vs. (C2) Red Deer Rebels ====
April 2	Moose Jaw Warriors	3 – 4	Red Deer Rebels	Moose Jaw Civic Centre

April 3	Moose Jaw Warriors	2 – 3	Red Deer Rebels	Moose Jaw Civic Centre

April 6	Red Deer Rebels	2 – 4	Moose Jaw Warriors	Marchant Crane Centrium

April 7	Red Deer Rebels	1 – 2	OT	Moose Jaw Warriors	Marchant Crane Centrium

April 15	Moose Jaw Warriors	1 – 2	2OT	Red Deer Rebels	Moose Jaw Civic Centre

April 17	Red Deer Rebels	3 – 0	Moose Jaw Warriors	Marchant Crane Centrium

Red Deer wins series 4 – 2

==== (B1) Kelowna Rockets vs. (U3) Tri-City Americans ====
April 2	Kelowna Rockets	2 – 3	OT	Tri-City Americans	Prospera Place

April 3	Kelowna Rockets	3 – 4	OT	Tri-City Americans	Prospera Place

April 6	Tri-City Americans	1 – 4	Kelowna Rockets	Toyota Center

April 7	Tri-City Americans	3 – 4	OT	Kelowna Rockets	Toyota Center

April 9	Kelowna Rockets	7 – 2	Tri-City Americans	Prospera Place

April 11	Tri-City Americans	1 – 2	Kelowna Rockets	Toyota Center

Kelowna wins series 4 – 2

==== (U1) Everett Silvertips vs. (B2) Vancouver Giants ====
April 2	Vancouver Giants	2 – 1	Everett Silvertips	Pacific Coliseum

April 3	Vancouver Giants	1 – 3	Everett Silvertips	Pacific Coliseum

April 5	Everett Silvertips	1 – 3	Vancouver Giants	Everett Event Center

April 8	Everett Silvertips	4 – 0	Vancouver Giants	Everett Event Center

April 9	Vancouver Giants	2 – 6	Everett Silvertips	Pacific Coliseum

April 11	Everett Silvertips	3 – 2	Vancouver Giants	Everett Event Center

Everett wins series 4 – 2

=== Conference finals ===
==== (C1) Medicine Hat Tigers vs. (C2) Red Deer Rebels ====
April 16	Medicine Hat Tigers	0 – 1	Red Deer Rebels	Medicine Hat Arena

April 17	Medicine Hat Tigers	4 – 2	Red Deer Rebels	Medicine Hat Arena

April 20	Red Deer Rebels	3 – 1	Medicine Hat Tigers	Toyota Center

April 21	Red Deer Rebels	1 – 2	Medicine Hat Tigers	Toyota Center

April 23	Medicine Hat Tigers	4 – 3	Red Deer Rebels	Medicine Hat Arena

April 25	Red Deer Rebels	2 – 4	Medicine Hat Tigers	Toyota Center

Medicine Hat wins series 4 – 2

==== (B1) Kelowna Rockets vs. (U1) Everett Silvertips ====
April 16	Kelowna Rockets	2 – 3	Everett Silvertips	Prospera Place

April 17	Kelowna Rockets	2 – 1	Everett Silvertips	Prospera Place

April 20	Everett Silvertips	1 – 2	Kelowna Rockets	Everett Event Center

April 22	Everett Silvertips	3 – 4	Kelowna Rockets	Everett Event Center

April 24	Kelowna Rockets	0 – 1	OT	Everett Silvertips	Prospera Place

April 26	Everett Silvertips	2 – 1	OT	Kelowna Rockets	Everett Event Center

April 27	Kelowna Rockets	1 – 2	OT	Everett Silvertips	Prospera Place

Everett wins series 4 – 3

=== WHL Championship ===
==== (C1) Medicine Hat Tigers vs. (U1) Everett Silvertips ====
April 30	Medicine Hat Tigers	4 – 1	Brandon Wheat Kings	Medicine Hat Arena

May 1	Medicine Hat Tigers	3 – 0	Brandon Wheat Kings	Medicine Hat Arena

May 4	Brandon Wheat Kings	0 – 3	Medicine Hat Tigers	Everett Event Center

May 5	Brandon Wheat Kings	2 – 4	Medicine Hat Tigers	Everett Event Center

Medicine Hat wins series 4 – 0

== RE/Max Canada-Russia Challenge ==
On November 26, Team WHL defeated the Russian Selects 4–1 in Calgary, Alberta before a crowd of 7,844.

On November 27, Team WHL defeated the Russian Selects 7–1 in Brandon, Manitoba before a crowd of 4,908.

== WHL awards ==
Four Broncos Memorial Trophy (Player of the Year): Cam Ward, Red Deer Rebels
Daryl K. (Doc) Seaman Trophy (Scholastic Player of the Year): Devan Dubnyk, Kamloops Blazers
Scholastic Team of the Year: Portland Winterhawks
Bob Clarke Trophy (Top scorer): Tyler Redenbach, Swift Current Broncos
Brad Hornung Trophy (Most Sportsmanlike Player): Nigel Dawes, Kootenay Ice
Bill Hunter Trophy (Top Defenseman): Dion Phaneuf, Red Deer Rebels
Jim Piggott Memorial Trophy (Rookie of the Year): Gilbert Brule, Vancouver Giants
Del Wilson Trophy (Top Goaltender): Cam Ward, Red Deer Rebels
Dunc McCallum Memorial Trophy (Coach of the Year): Kevin Constantine, Everett Silvertips
Lloyd Saunders Memorial Trophy (Executive of the Year): Kelly Kisio, Calgary Hitmen
Scotty Munro Memorial Trophy (Best regular season record): Kelowna Rockets
Allen Paradice Memorial Trophy (Top Official): Rob Matsuoka
St. Clair Group Trophy (Marketing/Public Relations Award): Mark Stiles, Calgary Hitmen
Doug Wickenheiser Memorial Trophy (Humanitarian of the Year): Braydon Coburn, Portland Winter Hawks
WHL Plus-Minus Award: Andrew Ladd, Calgary Hitmen
WHL Playoff Most Valuable Player: Kevin Nastiuk, Medicine Hat Tigers

== All-Star teams ==
Eastern Conference
	First Team		Second Team	
Goal	Cam Ward	Red Deer Rebels	Rejean Beauchemin	Prince Albert Raiders
Defense	Dion Phaneuf	Red Deer Rebels	Derek Meech	Red Deer Rebels
Defense	Mark Ardelan	Prince Albert Raiders	Aaron Rome	Moose Jaw Warriors
Forward	Kyle Brodziak	Moose Jaw Warriors	Tomas Fleischmann	Moose Jaw Warriors
Forward	Ryan Getzlaf	Calgary Hitmen	Seth Leonard	Prince Albert Raiders
Forward	Jeremy Williams	Swift Current Broncos	Tyler Redenbach	Swift Current Broncos
Western Conference
	First Team		Second Team	
Goal	Kelly Guard	Kelowna Rockets	Jeff Harvey	Everett Silvertips
Defense	Josh Gorges	Kelowna Rockets	Richie Regehr	Portland Winter Hawks
Defense	Braydon Coburn	Portland Winter Hawks	Shea Weber	Kelowna Rockets
Forward	Adam Courchaine	Vancouver Giants	Brandon Dubinsky	Portland Winter Hawks
Forward	Nigel Dawes	Kootenay Ice	Chad Klassen	Spokane Chiefs
Forward	Ryan Kinasewich	Tri-City Americans	Brad Schell	Spokane Chiefs

- source: Western Hockey League press release

== 2004 Bantam Draft ==
The 2004 WHL Bantam Draft was held at the WHL's head office in Calgary on April 29, 2004.

List of first round picks in the bantam draft.

#	Player	Nationality	WHL Team
1	Ryan Kerr (D)	Canada	Prince George Cougars
2	Colton Gillies (C)	Canada	Saskatoon Blades
3	Thomas Hickey (D)	Canada	Seattle Thunderbirds
4	Dwight King (C)	United States	Lethbridge Hurricanes
5	Brett Leffler (RW)	Canada	Regina Pats
6	Brandon Sutter (RW)	Canada	Red Deer Rebels (via Brandon)
7	John Negrin (D)	Canada	Kootenay Ice
8	Drayson Bowman (C)	United States	Spokane Chiefs
9	Joel Broda (C)	Canada	Tri-City Americans
10	Colton Sceviour (RW)	Canada	Portland Winter Hawks
11	Keith Aulie (D)	Canada	Brandon Wheat Kings (via Kamloops)
12	Paul Postma (D)	Canada	Swift Current Broncos
13	Brett Sonne (C)	Canada	Calgary Hitmen (via Everett)
14	Tyson Sexsmith (G)	Canada	Vancouver Giants
15	Eric Doyle (D)	Canada	Everett Silvertips (via Calgary)
16	Travis Dunstall (LW)	Canada	Kamloops Blazers (via Red Deer)
17	Justin Palazzo (D)	Canada	Prince Albert Raiders
18	Travis Ehrhardt (D)	Canada	Moose Jaw Warriors
19	Jordie Deagle (LW)	Canada	Medicine Hat Tigers
20	Luke Schenn (D)	Canada	Kelowna Rockets

== See also ==
- 2004 NHL entry draft
- 2003 in sports
- 2004 in sports

Preceded by 2002–03 WHL season	WHL seasons	Succeeded by 2004–05 WHL season
