= Brendan Gallagher =

Canadian ice hockey player (born 1992)

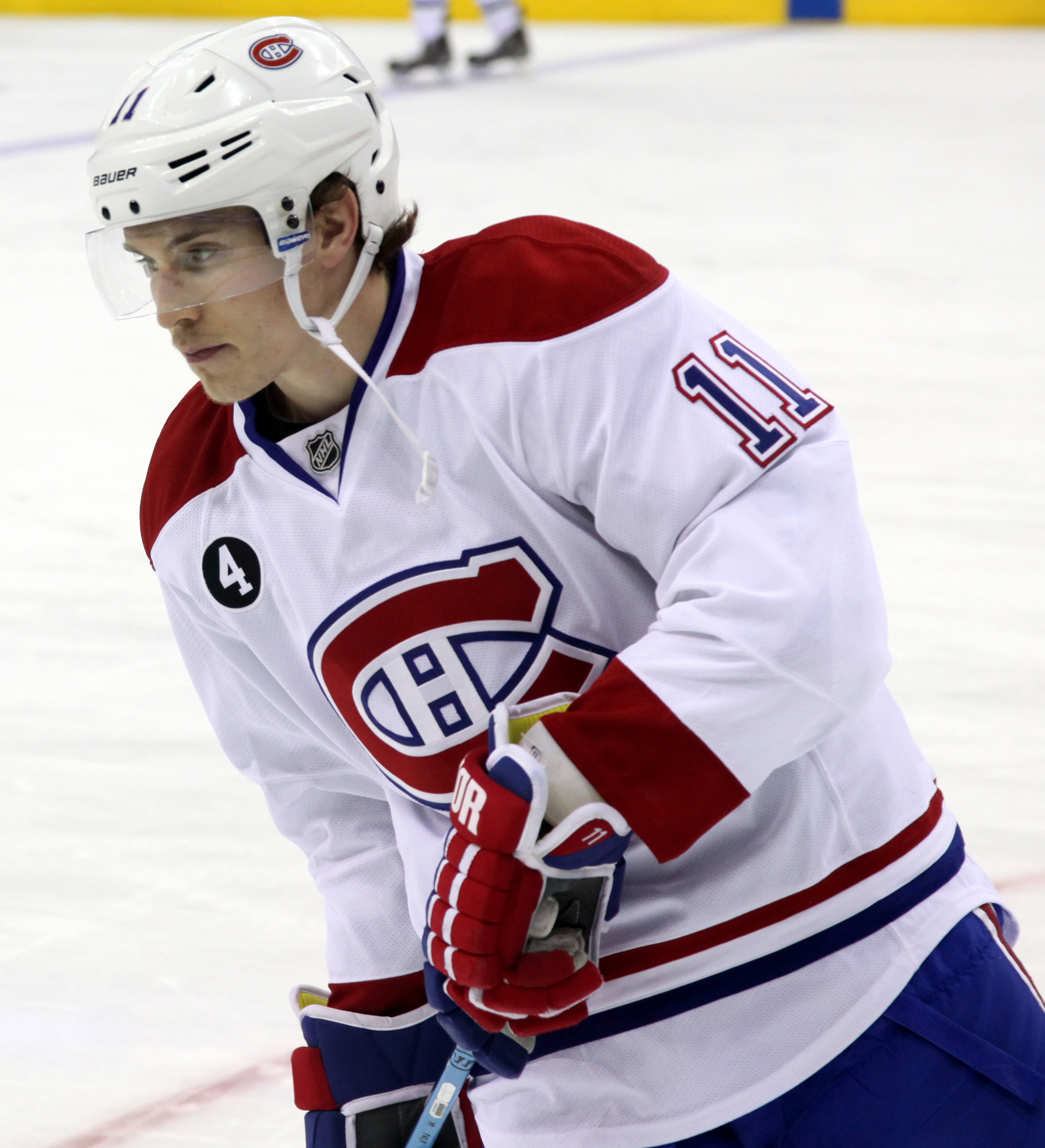
- Gallagher with the Montreal Canadiens in January 2015
- Born: May 6, 1992 (age 34) Edmonton, Alberta, Canada
- Height: 5 ft 9 in (175 cm)
- Weight: 185 lb (84 kg; 13 st 3 lb)
- Position: Right wing
- Shoots: Right
- NHL team Former teams: Vancouver Canucks; Montreal Canadiens
- National team: Canada
- NHL draft: 147th overall, 2010; Montreal Canadiens
- Playing career: 2012–present

Brendan Gallagher (born May 6, 1992) is a Canadian professional ice hockey player who is a right winger for the Vancouver Canucks of the National Hockey League (NHL). He was selected in the fifth round, 147th overall, by the Montreal Canadiens in the 2010 NHL entry draft, with whom he played fourteen seasons from 2013 to 2026.

During his four-year major junior career, Gallagher received Western Hockey League (WHL) West First All-Star Team honors twice (2010–11 and 2011–12) and became the Vancouver Giants' all-time leading goal- and point-scorer. Internationally, he won a bronze medal with Canada at the 2012 World Junior Championships, alongside a gold medal at the 2016 World Championship.

== Playing career ==
=== Junior ===
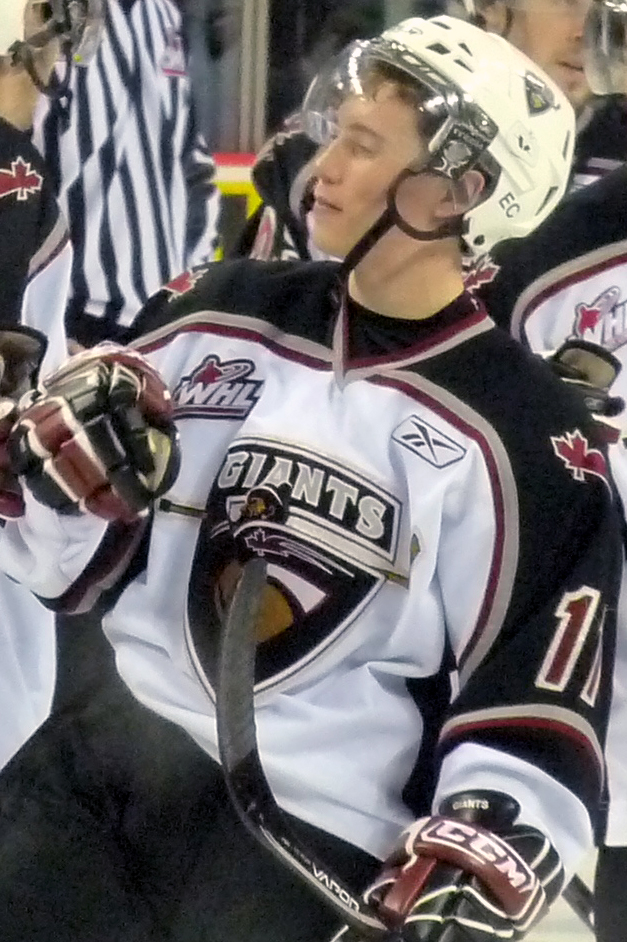
Gallagher with the Vancouver Giants in April 2009

As a youth playing within the South Delta Minor Hockey Association, Gallagher was selected in the ninth round of the 2007 Western Hockey League (WHL) bantam draft by the Vancouver Giants. After a single season with the Greater Vancouver Canadians of the British Columbia Hockey Major Midget League (BCMML), he joined the Giants for his rookie campaign in 2008–09, scoring his first WHL goal on September 27, 2008 in a 7–3 win over the Prince George Cougars. Finishing the regular season with ten goals and 31 points over 52 games, Gallagher added three points (one goal, two assists) in 16 postseason contests, as the Giants were eliminated in the semifinals by the Kelowna Rockets. The following season, he improved to 81 points over 72 games, ranking second among Giants players behind Craig Cunningham, while his 41 goals were a team high. His strong play continued into that year's playoffs, helping the Giants to the semifinals for a second consecutive year. Overall, Gallagher registered 21 points (11 goals and 10 assists) in 16 postseason games, ranking second in team-scoring and fifth across the league, as Vancouver was eliminated by the Tri-City Americans.

During the playoffs of his draft eligible season, Gallagher was selected as the Male Youth Athlete of the Year for his hometown of Delta, British Columbia. Initially ranked 152nd among North American skaters by the NHL Central Scouting Bureau, he was selected in the fifth round (147th overall) of the 2010 NHL entry draft by the Montreal Canadiens. Returning to the major junior ranks thereafter, Gallagher recorded career highs in 2010–11. On February 28, 2011, he was named WHL Player of the Week after recording ten points (five goals and five assists) in three games. In March 2011, Gallagher was sidelined with a head injury, sustained after receiving a hit in a game against the Portland Winterhawks. Despite this setback, Gallagher finished first in team scoring as well as eighth amongst all WHL players with 91 points over 66 games, earning himself recognition as part of the league's West First All-Star Team. His 44 goals were just four shy of Evander Kane's single-season team record.

Appearing in his second training camp with the Canadiens leading up to the 2011–12 season, Gallagher was signed to a three-year, entry-level contract upon return to his junior squad. In December 2011, he temporarily left the Giants for the Canadian national junior team. On January 7, 2012, Gallagher recorded a seven-point effort in his WHL return including a hat-trick against the Portland Winterhawks. Three days later, he assumed team captaincy after predecessor James Henry was dealt to the Moose Jaw Warriors. Not long after, Gallagher sustained an upper-body injury after colliding into the boards while pursuing a loose puck in a game against the Tri-City Americans. Following return to the lineup in late January, he proceeded to break both the Giants' record for all-time goals and points set by Adam Courchaine seven years prior. With a hat-trick against the Tri-City Americans on February 14, Gallagher surpassed Courchaine's mark of 126 goals. Eleven days later, he recorded two goals in a 5–3 win against the Kamloops Blazers for his record-setting 274th point as a Giant. Near the end of the season, he was voted by a panel of WHL players, executives and broadcasters as the most valuable player to his team in the Tri-City Herald's annual survey and once again earned league West First All-Star Team honors.

Over the course of his junior career, Gallagher had earned a reputation as a fast-skating scorer who plays with energy and aggression, making him adept in both offensive and defensive situations.

=== Professional ===
==== Montreal Canadiens (2013–2026) ====
At the onset of his first professional season, Gallagher was assigned to the Canadiens' American Hockey League (AHL) affiliate, the Hamilton Bulldogs, due to the ongoing NHL lockout at the time. Upon resolution, he was recalled to training camp and joined the Canadiens for the shortened 2012–13 season. After registering an assist in his league debut on January 22, 2013, against the Florida Panthers, Gallagher scored his first NHL goal five days later versus goaltender Martin Brodeur in a 4–3 win over the New Jersey Devils. Following the reacquisition of Michael Ryder by the Canadiens in February 2013, Gallagher switched from jersey number 73 to 11 to accommodate the veteran forward, who had worn 73 throughout his NHL career. It was later revealed that Ryder had offered Gallagher a Rolex watch in return of the number 73, however, this promise was never fulfilled. He ended his rookie campaign with a total of 15 goals and 13 assists in 44 games, establishing himself as a key member of Montreal's offence, often playing on the Canadiens' first line. On May 6, 2013, Gallagher received nomination for the Calder Memorial Trophy as the NHL's Rookie of the Year, and placed second in voting.

On November 29, 2014, the Canadiens agreed to terms with Gallagher on a six-year contract extension.

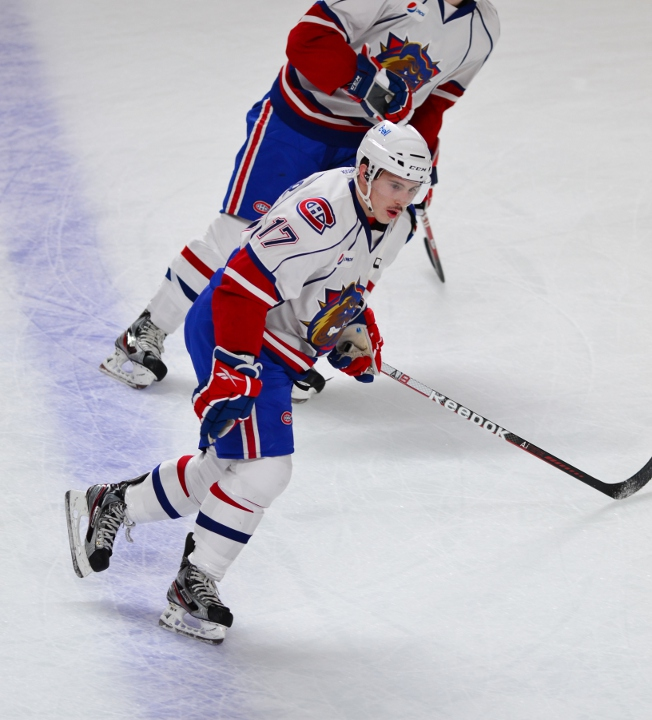
Gallagher with the Bulldogs in November 2012. He was assigned to the team during the 2012–13 NHL lockout.

On September 18, 2015, the team announced Gallagher as one of their newly appointed alternate captains along with P. K. Subban, Tomáš Plekanec, and Andrei Markov. During the course of the 2015–16 season, Gallagher broke two fingers after blocking a shot from Johnny Boychuk and would require corrective surgery. He returned to the Canadiens lineup for the 2016 NHL Winter Classic. His injury woes continued into the following season whereas Gallagher broke his hand and missed a period of eight weeks as a result.

The 2017–18 season was a career year for Gallagher, despite the Canadiens not qualifying for the Stanley Cup playoffs. He was placed on a shutdown line along with centreman Tomáš Plekanec and led the team in even-strength points. Gallagher ended the regular season with a career-high 54 points and was nominated for the King Clancy Memorial Trophy as a player who best exemplifies leadership qualities and community contributions. He was likewise named the recipient of the Canadiens' annual Molson Cup honor as player of the year.

For the 2018–19 season, Gallagher was once again named as team alternate captain with the inclusion of Paul Byron. On February 21, 2019, Gallagher recorded his first career NHL hat-trick in a 5–1 win against the Philadelphia Flyers. He played in his 500th career NHL game against the Arizona Coyotes on October 30, 2019, registering a goal.

On October 14, 2020, Gallagher signed a six-year, $39 million contract extension with the Canadiens.

On May 31, 2021, Gallagher scored the critical first goal of game 7 against the Toronto Maple Leafs after the Leafs' Mitch Marner accidentally passed the puck to him. The Canadiens ultimately won the game 3–1 to complete their comeback from a 3–1 series deficit in the first round of the 2021 Stanley Cup playoffs. On June 1, Gallagher netted the game winner in game 1 against the Winnipeg Jets, whom the Canadiens swept in the second round. On June 24, Gallagher had an assist on Artturi Lehkonen's semifinal series winner in game 6 overtime against the Vegas Golden Knights, sending the Canadiens to their first Stanley Cup Final in 28 years. His team ultimately lost the ensuing series to defending champions, the Tampa Bay Lightning, in five games.

Following appearance in the 2021 Stanley Cup Final, the 2021–22 season was a struggle for both Gallagher individually and the Canadiens overall. As a result of various injuries and a severe bout of COVID-19, Gallagher collectively missed 26 games and, after four consecutive years as one of the league's most dominant forwards during five-on-five play, would not score a goal at even strength until an April 5, 2022 game against the Ottawa Senators. Newly appointed team head coach Martin St-Louis expressed a desire to "rewire" Gallagher's approach to playing the game, encouraging him to "use up less physical energy by playing a bit more of a mental game." Finishing with just seven goals and 17 assists, Gallagher would later say that the main consolation of his worst season production wise to date was a four-month off-season that would enable him to recover his health and strength by working with his father Ian. While there was some discussion of Gallagher being named the team's new captain following the departure of Shea Weber, this was ultimately given to Nick Suzuki.

Injury again caused Gallagher to miss significant playing time during the 2022–23 season whereas he would break his ankle blocking a shot in the team's twelfth game of the season and, despite attempting to play through, suffer yet another break in January 2023. As a result, Gallagher would be sidelined until the end of March. That same month, he scored his 200th career NHL goal in a game against the Buffalo Sabres on March 27, tying the contest late in the third period. When discussing his perpetuation to injury at season's end, Gallagher said he would have to change his approach to his health, admitting "it's really hard to change your identity as a player and everything that I've always believed in. But, certainly, in the end I ended up missing more time due to it. That's something I'll have to think about and going forward probably be a little bit more honest with myself about."

During the course of the 2024–25 season, Gallagher played in his 800th career NHL game on January 23, 2025, versus the Detroit Red Wings. Days later, he surpassed Jean-Guy Talbot on the Canadiens' all-time games played list to enter the top-20 across franchise history.

The 2025–26 season saw Gallagher's role on the team decline in prominence, and he was made a healthy scratch from the lineup versus the San Jose Sharks on March 14, 2026, the first such occurrence dating back to his rookie season in January 2013. Thereafter, he appeared in his 900th career NHL game on March 17. He ultimately finished the regular season with seven goals and 16 assists in 77 games. With his team qualifying for the 2026 Stanley Cup playoffs and facing the Tampa Bay Lightning in the first round, Gallagher was left out of the lineup for the first four games. He made his debut of the postseason in game 5 on April 29, where he scored the opening goal on his first shift. The Canadiens would go on to secure a 3–2 win. He subsequently made his final appearance of the postseason on May 3, and did not see the ice for the entirety of the Eastern Conference final series against the Carolina Hurricanes.

Following the conclusion of the 2026 playoffs, Gallagher announced that, in light of his diminished usage, it was "pretty clear I'll be moving on here," adding that he had been "very fortunate" with respect to his time in Montreal.

==== Vancouver Canucks (2026–present) ====
On June 29, 2026, Gallagher was traded to the Vancouver Canucks, ending his 14-year tenure with the Canadiens organization. With the Canucks having finished last in the league during the previous season and entering a team rebuild, Gallagher observed that "I hope there are some young players that I can help out, help out expedite their development and certain areas of what being a pro is all about, and hopefully I'll be able to bring that to the group."

== International play ==
Medal record

Men's ice hockey

Representing Canada

World Championship
Gold medal – first place	2016 Russia	

World Junior Championships
Bronze medal – third place	2012 Canada	

World U-17 Hockey Challenge
Silver medal – second place	2009 Canada	

Internationally, Gallagher first represented Hockey Canada as part of Team Pacific at the 2009 World U-17 Hockey Challenge, earning a silver medal. In December 2010, Gallagher was invited to the annual selection camp for the Canadian national junior team, but failed to make the roster after being amongst the initial cuts. The following year, Gallagher made the team for the 2012 World Junior Championships, held in his home province of Alberta. In the last contest of the preliminary round, he was named his country's player of the game after recording a game-high seven shots on goal in a 3–2 win against the United States. Gallagher then recorded a goal and two assists on Canada's last three goals in their semifinal matchup against Russia, helping them get within one goal of erasing a 6–1 deficit. Canada went on to capture bronze following a 4–0 defeat over Finland. For his part, Gallagher finished the tournament with six points (three goals and three assists), tying for fifth in team scoring, while leading Canada with 35 shots on goal.

In April 2016, Gallagher was added to the national senior team for the 2016 World Championship where he scored two goals and three assists for a total of five points in ten games en route to a gold medal victory.

== Personal life ==
Gallagher was born in Edmonton, Alberta, but grew up in Tsawwassen, British Columbia, after moving there with his family at the age of 12. As a youth, he played in the 2005 Quebec International Pee-Wee Hockey Tournament with a minor ice hockey team from Burnaby.

His father, Ian, is a strength and conditioning coach for the Vancouver Giants. Prior to joining the Giants himself as a player, Gallagher was familiar with the team through Ian's work. His mother, Della, likewise came from an athletic background, and was previously both a baseball shortstop and catcher. She died in March 2025 after a prolonged battle with stage 4 brain cancer. He has three siblings – sisters Erin, a senior cost accountant at Stemcell Technologies in Vancouver, and Breanne, a student-athlete who plays soccer at the University of Calgary, as well as a brother, Nolan, who is a member of the Burnaby Fire Department.

In January 2014, McDonald's introduced "The Gallagher" burger across its Quebec-based restaurants. Gallagher again created a signature burger for the fast food chain prior to the 2015–16 NHL season, along with teammate Alex Galchenyuk, who likewise created one of his own.

He is a supporter of Tottenham Hotspur F.C. of the Premier League as well as the Cincinnati Bengals of the National Football League (NFL).

In July 2023, Gallagher got engaged to Québécoise Emma Fortin in Whistler, British Columbia. They were married in Montreal a year later, and welcomed their first child together in February 2025.

== Career statistics ==
=== Regular season and playoffs ===
			Regular season					Playoffs
Season	Team	League	GP	G	A	Pts	PIM	GP	G	A	Pts	PIM
2007–08	Greater Vancouver Canadians	BCMML	39	23	33	56	66	2	0	1	1	0
2008–09	Vancouver Giants	WHL	52	10	21	31	61	16	1	2	3	10
2009–10	Vancouver Giants	WHL	72	41	40	81	111	16	11	10	21	14
2010–11	Vancouver Giants	WHL	66	44	47	91	108	4	2	0	2	16
2011–12	Vancouver Giants	WHL	54	41	36	77	79	6	5	5	10	16
2012–13	Hamilton Bulldogs	AHL	36	10	10	20	61	—	—	—	—	—
2012–13	Montreal Canadiens	NHL	44	15	13	28	33	5	2	0	2	5
2013–14	Montreal Canadiens	NHL	81	19	22	41	73	17	4	7	11	6
2014–15	Montreal Canadiens	NHL	82	24	23	47	31	12	3	2	5	0
2015–16	Montreal Canadiens	NHL	53	19	21	40	24	—	—	—	—	—
2016–17	Montreal Canadiens	NHL	64	10	19	29	39	6	1	2	3	8
2017–18	Montreal Canadiens	NHL	82	31	23	54	34	—	—	—	—	—
2018–19	Montreal Canadiens	NHL	82	33	19	52	49	—	—	—	—	—
2019–20	Montreal Canadiens	NHL	59	22	21	43	29	9	1	3	4	2
2020–21	Montreal Canadiens	NHL	35	14	9	23	16	22	2	4	6	4
2020–21	Laval Rocket	AHL	1	0	0	0	4	—	—	—	—	—
2021–22	Montreal Canadiens	NHL	56	7	17	24	69	—	—	—	—	—
2022–23	Montreal Canadiens	NHL	37	8	6	14	45	—	—	—	—	—
2023–24	Montreal Canadiens	NHL	77	16	15	31	74	—	—	—	—	—
2024–25	Montreal Canadiens	NHL	82	21	17	38	39	5	0	2	2	0
2025–26	Montreal Canadiens	NHL	77	7	16	23	39	3	1	0	1	0
NHL totals			911	246	241	487	594	79	14	20	34	25

=== International ===
Year	Team	Event	Result	GP	G	A	Pts	PIM
2009	Canada Pacific	U17	2nd place, silver medalist(s)	6	2	3	5	12
2012	Canada	WJC	3rd place, bronze medalist(s)	6	3	3	6	12
2016	Canada	WC	1st place, gold medalist(s)	10	2	3	5	12
Junior totals				12	5	6	11	24
Senior totals				10	2	3	5	12

== Awards and honours ==
Award	Year	Ref
BCMML
U18 AAA All-Star Team	2008	
CHL
CHL Canada/Russia Series	2010, 2011	
WHL
First All-Star Team	2011, 2012	
NHL
All-Rookie Team	2013	
Montreal Canadiens
Molson Cup winner	2018	

== Records ==
Vancouver Giants

- All-time goals leader – 136 (Note: surpassed Adam Courchaine, 126 goals from 2001–05)
- All-time points leader – 280 (Note: surpassed Adam Courchaine, 273 points from 2001–05)
