= Kinasewich =

Kinasewich is a surname. Notable people with the surname include:

- Ray Kinasewich (1933–2021), Canadian ice hockey player and coach
- Ryan Kinasewich (born 1983), Canadian ice hockey player
