= Chad Bassen =

Canadian-German ice hockey player

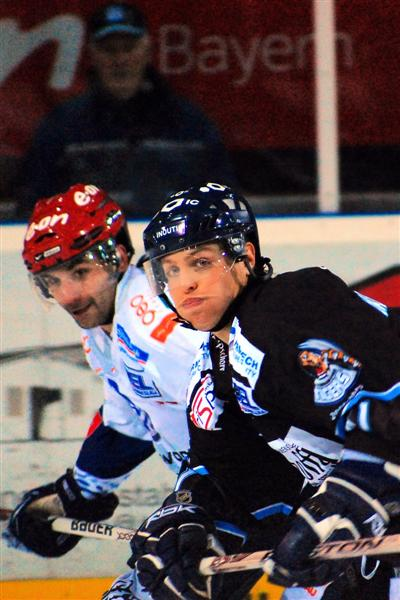
- Bassen (right) with Straubing Tigers in 2008
- Born: April 25, 1983 (age 43) Strathmore, Alberta, Canada
- Height: 5 ft 11 in (180 cm)
- Weight: 185 lb (84 kg; 13 st 3 lb)
- Position: Left wing
- Shoots: Left
- DEL2 team Former teams: EHC Freiburg; Frankfurt Lions; Straubing Tigers; Hamburg Freezers; Augsburger Panther; EHC Wolfsburg; Iserlohn Roosters; Thomas Sabo Ice Tigers
- NHL draft: Undrafted
- Playing career: 2004–present

Chad Bassen (born April 25, 1983) is a Canadian-German professional ice hockey forward who is currently playing with EHC Freiburg of the DEL2. Bassen holds a Canadian and a German passport, part of his family come from Germany. His uncle Mark Bassen also played professionally.

== Playing career ==
Bassen played in the WHL for the Regina Pats, Vancouver Giants, Medicine Hat Tigers and Everett Silvertips before taking his game overseas. In 2004, he signed his first contract in Germany, joining the Frankfurt Lions of the top-flight Deutsche Eishockey Liga (DEL). He left the Lions after the 2006–07 season and moved to the Straubing Tigers, where he spent the following three years.

He then played for the Hamburg Freezers during the 2010–11 DEL season. On April 6, 2011, Bassen signed with Augsburger Panther to a one-year contract. After the conclusion of his second season with Augsburg in 2012–13, Bassen was released as a free agent and signed for his fifth DEL club, EHC Wolfsburg on July 15, 2013.

Prior to the 2014–15 campaign, Bassen agreed to terms on a contract with fellow DEL side Iserlohn Roosters.

Entering the 2018–19 season, Bassen left the Roosters and agreed to a one-year contract with the Thomas Sabo Ice Tigers on September 12, 2018. Rejuvenated by the change of scenery, Bassen regained his offensive touch and during the campaign on January 30, 2019, he was signed to a one-year extension to remain with the Ice Tigers through 2020.

== Career statistics ==
			Regular season					Playoffs
Season	Team	League	GP	G	A	Pts	PIM	GP	G	A	Pts	PIM
2000–01	Regina Pats	WHL	50	9	4	13	47	6	0	1	1	2
2001–02	Regina Pats	WHL	21	2	4	6	23	—	—	—	—	—
2001–02	Vancouver Giants	WHL	44	5	16	21	44	—	—	—	—	—
2002–03	Vancouver Giants	WHL	13	3	2	5	15	—	—	—	—	—
2002–03	Medicine Hat Tigers	WHL	55	13	20	33	70	11	5	2	7	6
2003–04	Medicine Hat Tigers	WHL	12	2	6	8	14	—	—	—	—	—
2003–04	Everett Silvertips	WHL	43	10	14	24	44	21	3	3	6	24
2004–05	Frankfurt Lions	DEL	37	1	0	1	53	8	0	0	0	2
2005–06	Frankfurt Lions	DEL	45	1	5	6	61	—	—	—	—	—
2006–07	Frankfurt Lions	DEL	40	2	10	12	65	8	1	1	2	18
2006–07	EV Landsberg	2.GBun	4	0	0	0	8	—	—	—	—	—
2007–08	Straubing Tigers	DEL	45	11	12	23	77	—	—	—	—	—
2008–09	Straubing Tigers	DEL	51	8	14	22	28	—	—	—	—	—
2009–10	Straubing Tigers	DEL	56	12	18	30	14	—	—	—	—	—
2010–11	Hamburg Freezers	DEL	52	5	4	9	34	—	—	—	—	—
2011–12	Augsburger Panther	DEL	52	9	16	25	46	2	0	0	0	0
2012–13	Augsburger Panther	DEL	42	8	4	12	16	2	0	1	1	14
2013–14	Grizzly Adams Wolfsburg	DEL	42	2	2	4	18	11	1	2	3	2
2014–15	Iserlohn Roosters	DEL	52	14	14	28	12	7	1	1	2	4
2015–16	Iserlohn Roosters	DEL	49	3	13	16	20	6	0	1	1	0
2016–17	Iserlohn Roosters	DEL	50	10	5	15	18	—	—	—	—	—
2017–18	Iserlohn Roosters	DEL	37	0	4	4	16	—	—	—	—	—
2018–19	Thomas Sabo Ice Tigers	DEL	50	6	15	21	36	8	1	1	2	4
2019–20	Thomas Sabo Ice Tigers	DEL	51	8	7	15	32	—	—	—	—	—
DEL totals			751	100	143	243	546	52	4	7	11	44
