= Brad Schell =

Canadian ice hockey player

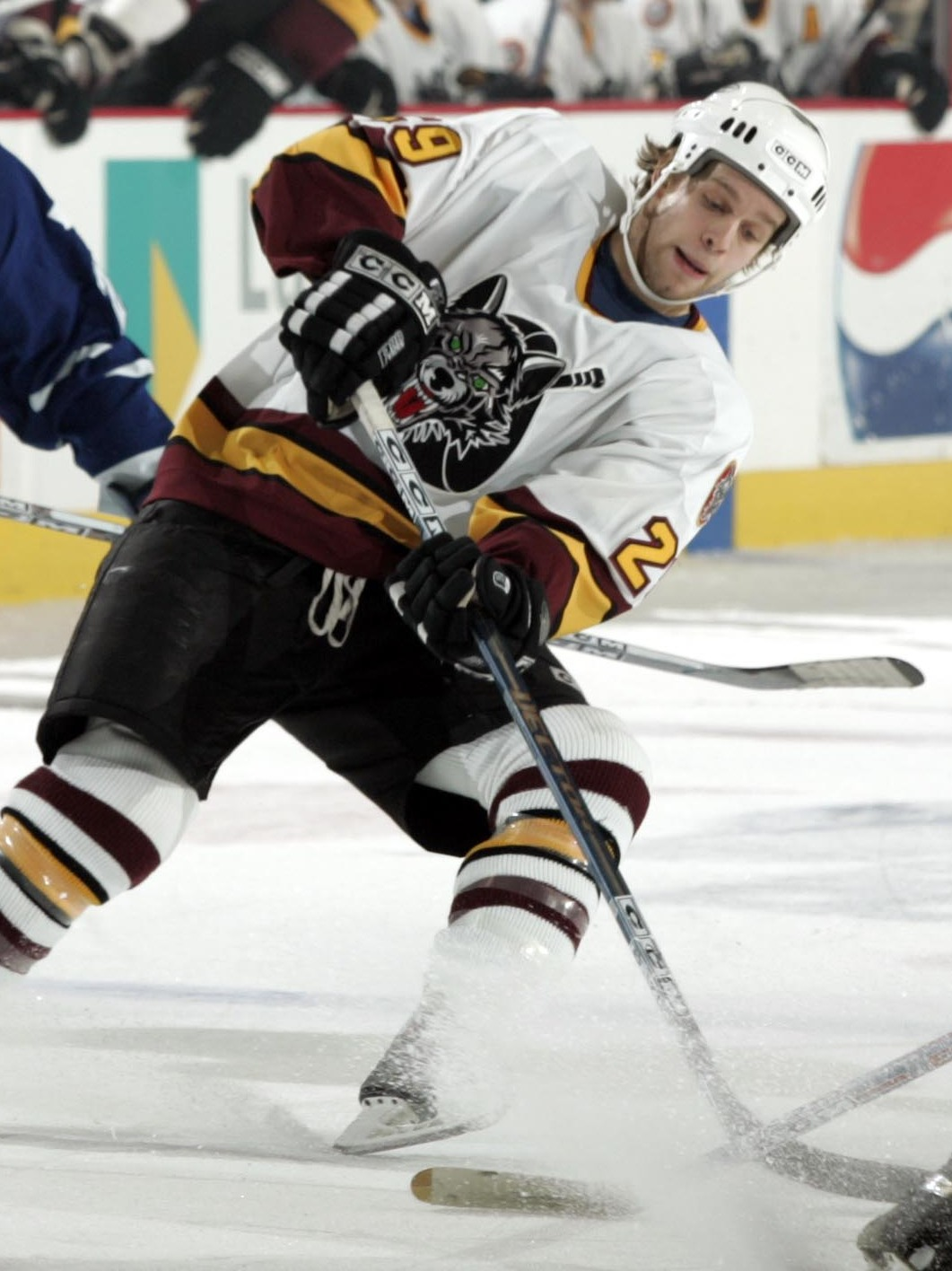
- Schell with the Chicago Wolves in 2006
- Born: August 5, 1984 (age 41) Scott, Saskatchewan, Canada
- Height: 6 ft 0 in (183 cm)
- Weight: 190 lb (86 kg; 13 st 8 lb)
- Position: Centre
- Shot: Left
- Played for: Gwinnett Gladiators; Chicago Wolves; San Antonio Rampage; Dornbirner EC; Graz 99ers Lillehammer IK; Milano Rossoblu; Herning Blue Fox; Heilbronner Falken
- NHL draft: 167th overall, 2002; Atlanta Thrashers
- Playing career: 2004–2016

Brad Schell (born August 5, 1984) is a Canadian former professional ice hockey forward. He was selected by the Atlanta Thrashers in the 9th round (167th overall) of the 2002 NHL entry draft.

Schell was named the captain of the American Conference team for the 2007 ECHL All-Star Game. Schell remained in Europe for his third consecutive season after agreeing to a one-year contract with Italian club, Hockey Milano Rossoblu on August 20, 2013.

After spending the 2014–15 season, with the Herning Blue Fox in the Danish Metal Ligaen, where he led the league in assists with 54 and captured a Danish Cup, Schell continued his journeyman European career, in moving Germany in signing a one-year deal with second tier club, Heilbronner Falken of the DEL2 on July 30, 2015.

He now coaches youth hockey at the Atlanta Ice Forum in Atlanta Georgia.

== Awards and honours ==
Award	Year
Western Hockey League West Second All-Star Team	2003-04
ECHL First All-Star Team	2006–07
ECHL MVP	2007

== Career statistics ==
			Regular season					Playoffs
Season	Team	League	GP	G	A	Pts	PIM	GP	G	A	Pts	PIM
1999–2000	Battlefords North Stars	SJHL	62	38	42	80	28	3	2	3	5	0
1999–2000	Spokane Chiefs	WHL	1	0	0	0	0	—	—	—	—	—
2000–01	Spokane Chiefs	WHL	60	7	6	13	10	12	0	2	2	2
2001–02	Spokane Chiefs	WHL	70	20	36	56	16	11	0	8	8	6
2002–03	Spokane Chiefs	WHL	37	8	13	21	26	10	0	5	5	2
2003–04	Spokane Chiefs	WHL	71	35	57	92	47	4	1	0	1	0
2004–05	Gwinnett Gladiators	ECHL	72	14	39	53	28	8	2	4	6	4
2005–06	Chicago Wolves	AHL	10	1	2	3	2	—	—	—	—	—
2005–06	Gwinnet Gladiators	ECHL	59	23	56	79	30	17	1	12	13	8
2006–07	Chicago Wolves	AHL	12	2	2	4	0	15	0	2	2	4
2006–07	Gwinnet Gladiators	ECHL	63	25	85	110	60	—	—	—	—	—
2007–08	Gwinnet Gladiators	ECHL	29	8	30	38	27	8	1	6	7	4
2008–09	Gwinnet Gladiators	ECHL	27	9	18	27	32	—	—	—	—	—
2008–09	San Antonio Rampage	AHL	1	0	0	0	2	—	—	—	—	—
2009–10	Gwinnet Gladiators	ECHL	12	0	18	18	8	—	—	—	—	—
2011–12	Dornbirner EC	AUT.2	27	18	32	50	18	—	—	—	—	—
2011–12	Graz 99ers	AUT	4	1	1	2	2	—	—	—	—	—
2012–13	Lillehammer IK	NOR	44	15	49	64	52	6	3	3	6	0
2013–14	Hockey Milano Rossoblu	ITA	38	10	35	45	18	4	0	4	4	4
2014–15	Herning Blue Fox	DEN	36	11	54	65	22	15	4	12	16	16
2015–16	Heilbronner Falken	DEL2	45	17	29	46	54	—	—	—	—	—
ECHL totals			262	79	246	325	185	33	4	22	26	16
AHL totals			23	3	4	7	4	15	0	2	2	4
