= Adam Courchaine =

Canadian ice hockey player (born 1984)

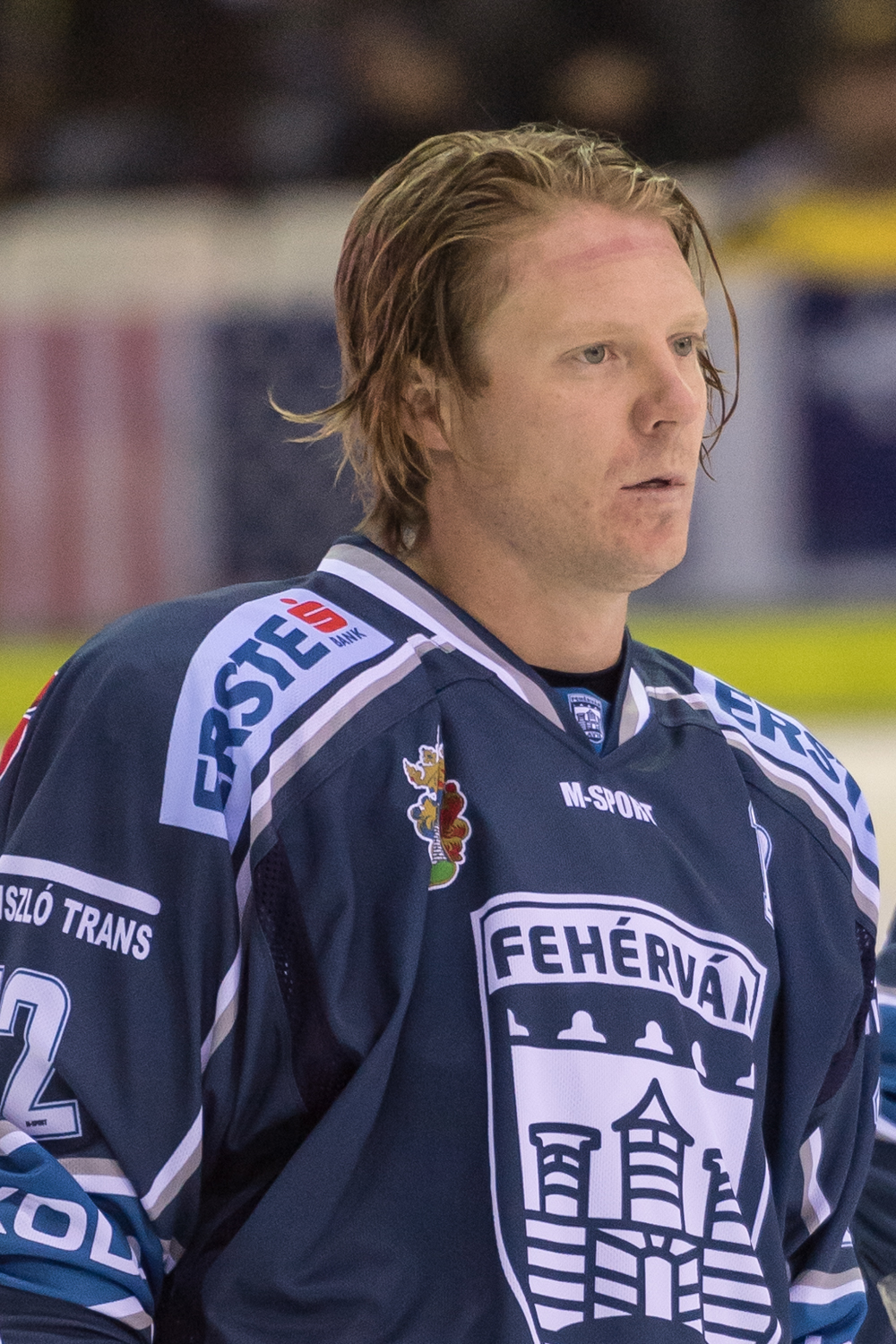
- Born: May 23, 1984 (age 42) Winnipeg, Manitoba, Canada
- Height: 5 ft 10 in (178 cm)
- Weight: 175 lb (79 kg; 12 st 7 lb)
- Position: Centre
- Shot: Left
- Played for: Houston Aeros; Füchse Duisburg; Düsseldorfer EG; Graz 99ers Krefeld Pinguine; EHC Olten; HK Hradec Kralove; Alba Volán Székesfehérvár; Coventry Blaze
- NHL draft: 219th overall, 2003; Minnesota Wild
- Playing career: 2005–2018

Adam Courchaine (born May 23, 1984) is a Canadian former professional ice hockey centre. He last played with the Coventry Blaze in the Elite Ice Hockey League (EIHL).

== Playing career ==
Courchaine was born in Winnipeg, Manitoba. Growing up in Winnipeg], Courchaine dominated at the minor hockey level with the AAA-midget Winnipeg Warriors, putting up 119 points in 50 games. In 2001–02, he joined the major junior ranks with the Medicine Hat Tigers of the Western Hockey League (WHL). He was traded during his rookie season to the Vancouver Giants during their inaugural season and became a cornerstone for the franchise in its beginning years. Courchaine put up a team-high 85 points in his first full season with the Giants, helping them to their first playoff appearance in 2003. His 43 goals established a Giants' franchise record which remained unbroken until Evander Kane surpassed the mark in 2008–09. Courchaine was also named a WHL West Second Team All-Star and was subsequently chosen in the off-season by the Minnesota Wild, 219th overall, in the 2003 NHL entry draft.

He played two more seasons with the Giants, leading them in scoring for a second consecutive season in 2003–04 with 82 points while being named to the WHL West First All-Star Team. In four seasons with the Giants, Courchaine led the team in scoring twice and accumulated a franchise all-time leading 126 goals and 273 points in 241 games until both records were broken in 2012 by Brendan Gallagher. His 147 assists was also a franchise record until it was surpassed by defenceman Jonathon Blum on February 7, 2009.

Graduating from major junior in 2005–06, Courchaine was assigned to the Wild's American Hockey League (AHL) affiliate, the Houston Aeros. However, he was a regular healthy scratch and was demoted to the ECHL where he played with the Pensacola Ice Pilots and Gwinnett Gladiators.

Although Courchaine was signed overseas by EK Zell am See of Austria, he spent the 2006–07 season inactive. The following season, Courchaine played in the German Deutsche Eishockey Liga with the Füchse Duisburg. He enjoyed more success than his rookie season in the minors and led Duisburg in scoring with 50 points. In the following 2008–09 season, he joined fellow German team, Düsseldorfer EG. After four year with the team and short stints with Austrian team Graz 99ers and Füchse Duisburg for a second time, he joined the Krefeld Pinguine. In 2013–14, Courchaine led the DEL in scoring, tallying 29 goals and 45 assists in 51 contests.

He parted company with the Krefeld team in January 2015 and signed with EHC Olten of the second division NLB in Switzerland the same month. He had six points (one goal, five assists) in five games for EHC.

Courchaine signed with Czech side HK Hradec Kralove for the 2015–16 campaign. He played for the Hungarian club Alba Volán Székesfehérvár in the early stages of the 2016–17 season, before returning to Germany, joining Düsseldorfer EG for a second stint. At DEG, he inked a deal for the remainder of the season.

On 31 July 2017, Courchaine moved to the UK's EIHL to sign with the Coventry Blaze.

== Career statistics ==
			Regular season					Playoffs
Season	Team	League	GP	G	A	Pts	PIM	GP	G	A	Pts	PIM
2000–01	Winnipeg Warriors AAA	MMHL	37	52	38	90	30	13	25	4	29	—
2001–02	Medicine Hat Tigers	WHL	44	5	5	10	6	—	—	—	—	—
2001–02	Vancouver Giants	WHL	29	16	12	28	8	—	—	—	—	—
2002–03	Vancouver Giants	WHL	71	43	42	85	24	4	2	1	3	2
2003–04	Vancouver Giants	WHL	70	39	43	82	34	11	4	6	10	6
2004–05	Vancouver Giants	WHL	71	28	50	78	32	6	4	3	7	2
2005–06	Houston Aeros	AHL	10	0	0	0	0	—	—	—	—	—
2005–06	Pensacola Ice Pilots	ECHL	42	21	28	49	24	—	—	—	—	—
2005–06	Gwinnett Gladiators	ECHL	3	0	2	2	0	17	5	8	13	6
2006–07	EK Zell am See	AUT.2	32	41	50	91	38	9	3	11	14	31
2007–08	Füchse Duisburg	DEL	56	28	22	50	30	—	—	—	—	—
2008–09	DEG Metro Stars	DEL	39	14	24	38	18	16	12	4	16	4
2009–10	DEG Metro Stars	DEL	50	18	26	44	18	3	1	0	1	0
2010–11	DEG Metro Stars	DEL	52	16	17	33	16	9	1	6	7	4
2011–12	DEG Metro Stars	DEL	52	13	15	28	30	7	2	5	7	0
2012–13	Graz 99ers	AUT	3	0	0	0	2	—	—	—	—	—
2012–13	Füchse Duisburg	GER.3	9	8	16	24	4	—	—	—	—	—
2012–13	Krefeld Pinguine	DEL	33	16	19	35	16	—	—	—	—	—
2013–14	Krefeld Pinguine	DEL	51	29	45	74	6	5	1	4	5	0
2014–15	Krefeld Pinguine	DEL	27	11	12	23	4	—	—	—	—	—
2014–15	EHC Olten	SUI.2	5	1	5	6	2	1	0	3	3	0
2015–16	Mountfield HK	ELH	48	17	13	30	8	6	0	1	1	4
2016–17	Alba Volán Székesfehérvár	EBEL	16	5	5	10	6	—	—	—	—	—
2016–17	Düsseldorfer EG	DEL	32	2	9	11	6	—	—	—	—	—
2017–18	Coventry Blaze	EIHL	51	15	36	51	8	2	0	2	2	0
DEL totals			392	148	188	336	144	40	17	19	36	8

== Awards and honours ==
Award	Year
WHL
West Second All-Star Team	2003
West First All-Star Team	2004

== Records ==
- Vancouver Giants' all-time leading point scorer – 273 (Broken in 2012 by Brendan Gallagher)
- Vancouver Giants' all-time leading goal scorer – 126 (Broken in 2012 by Brendan Gallagher)
