= WHL Playoff MVP =

Canadian junior ice hockey award

Each year, the Western Hockey League awards a trophy to the Most Valuable Player in the Playoffs.

== Winners ==
| Season | Player | Team |
| 1992 | Jarrett Deuling | Kamloops Blazers |
| 1993 | Andrew Schneider | Swift Current Broncos |
| 1994 | Steve Passmore | Kamloops Blazers |
| 1995 | Nolan Baumgartner | Kamloops Blazers |
| 1996 | Bobby Brown | Brandon Wheat Kings |
| 1997 | Blaine Russell | Lethbridge Hurricanes |
| 1998 | Brent Belecki | Portland Winter Hawks |
| 1999 | Brad Moran | Calgary Hitmen |
| 2000 | Dan Blackburn | Kootenay Ice |
| 2001 | Shane Bendera | Red Deer Rebels |
| 2002 | Duncan Milroy | Kootenay Ice |
| 2003 | Jesse Schultz | Kelowna Rockets |
| 2004 | Kevin Nastiuk | Medicine Hat Tigers |
| 2005 | Shea Weber | Kelowna Rockets |
| 2006 | Gilbert Brule | Vancouver Giants |
| 2007 | Matt Keetley | Medicine Hat Tigers |
| 2008 | Tyler Johnson | Spokane Chiefs |
| 2009 | Tyler Myers | Kelowna Rockets |
| 2010 | Martin Jones | Calgary Hitmen |
| 2011 | Nathan Lieuwen | Kootenay Ice |
| 2012 | Laurent Brossoit | Edmonton Oil Kings |
| 2013 | Ty Rattie | Portland Winterhawks |
| 2014 | Griffin Reinhart | Edmonton Oil Kings |
| 2015 | Leon Draisaitl | Kelowna Rockets |
| 2016 | Nolan Patrick | Brandon Wheat Kings |
| 2017 | Mathew Barzal | Seattle Thunderbirds |
| 2018 | Glenn Gawdin | Swift Current Broncos |
| 2019 | Ian Scott | Prince Albert Raiders |
| 2020 | Playoffs cancelled due to the coronavirus pandemic – trophy not awarded | |
| 2021 | Playoffs cancelled during pandemic – trophy not awarded | |
| 2022 | Kaiden Guhle | Edmonton Oil Kings |
| 2023 | Thomas Millic | Seattle Thunderbirds |
| 2024 | Denton Mateychuk | Moose Jaw Warriors |
| 2025 | Harrison Meneghin | Medicine Hat Tigers |
| 2026 | Julius Miettinen | Everett Silvertips |

== See also ==
- Stafford Smythe Memorial Trophy - Memorial Cup MVP
- Wayne Gretzky 99 Award - Ontario Hockey League Playoff MVP
- Guy Lafleur Trophy - Quebec Major Junior Hockey League Playoff MVP
