= Tyler Redenbach =

Canadian ice hockey player

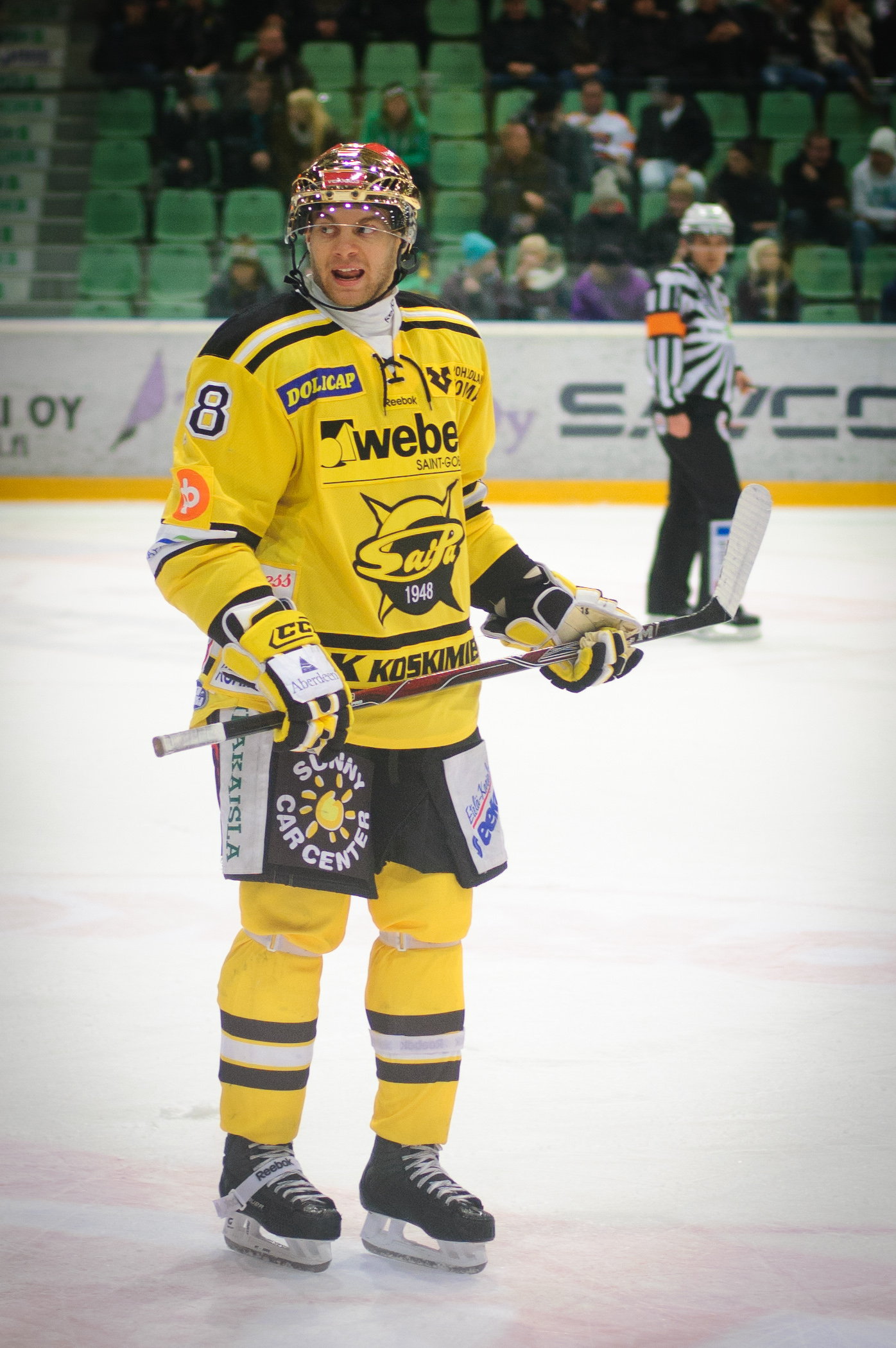
- Born: September 25, 1984 (age 41) Melville, Saskatchewan, Canada
- Height: 6 ft 0 in (183 cm)
- Weight: 194 lb (88 kg; 13 st 12 lb)
- Position: Centre
- Shot: Left
- Played for: Providence Bruins; San Antonio Rampage; Grand Rapids Griffins; Odense Bulldogs; SaiPa; HIFK; Lahti Pelicans; HC Davos; HC Pardubice; HC Oceláři Třinec; Tappara; HC Bílí Tygři Liberec; Oji Eagles
- NHL draft: 77th overall, 2003; Phoenix Coyotes
- Playing career: 2005–2020

Tyler Redenbach (born September 25, 1984) is a Canadian former ice hockey centre. He was selected 77th overall by the Phoenix Coyotes in the 2003 NHL entry draft.

== Career ==
Prior to playing in Europe, Redenbach had played 155 regular-season games in the American Hockey League for the Providence Bruins, San Antonio Rampage, and Grand Rapids Griffins.

Following the 2010–11 SM-liiga season, Redenbach signed a two-year contract with the Swiss EHC Olten. However his contract was terminated early and he signed with Helsingin IFK a day later in January 2012.

On February 15, 2015, during the 2014–15 season in the Liiga with Lahti Pelicans, Redenbach was released from his contract due to financial pressures and signed from the remainder of the campaign with Swiss club, HC Davos of the National League A.

In the 2015–16 season, Redenbach belatedly signed a one-year deal in the Czech Extraliga with HC Pardubice on October 11, 2015.

== Career statistics ==
			Regular season					Playoffs
Season	Team	League	GP	G	A	Pts	PIM	GP	G	A	Pts	PIM
2000–01	North Kamloops Lions AAA	Midget	49	60	66	126	22	—	—	—	—	—
2001–02	Prince George Cougars	WHL	65	3	18	21	30	7	0	1	1	2
2002–03	Prince George Cougars	WHL	36	8	34	42	29	—	—	—	—	—
2002–03	Swift Current Broncos	WHL	24	9	17	26	6	4	0	4	4	4
2003–04	Swift Current Broncos	WHL	71	31	74	105	52	5	1	1	2	14
2004–05	Swift Current Broncos	WHL	42	14	23	37	49	—	—	—	—	—
2004–05	Lethbridge Hurricanes	WHL	23	5	21	26	14	5	0	2	2	6
2005–06	Providence Bruins	AHL	78	26	32	58	42	—	—	—	—	—
2006–07	Providence Bruins	AHL	13	0	5	5	6	—	—	—	—	—
2006–07	San Antonio Rampage	AHL	30	6	14	20	12	—	—	—	—	—
2006–07	Phoenix RoadRunners	ECHL	7	0	4	4	0	—	—	—	—	—
2007–08	Arizona Sundogs	CHL	31	18	48	66	42	11	3	18	21	6
2007–08	San Antonio Rampage	AHL	6	0	1	1	4	—	—	—	—	—
2007–08	Grand Rapids Griffins	AHL	28	3	7	10	10	—	—	—	—	—
2008–09	Odense Bulldogs	DEN	43	24	44	68	51	11	5	8	13	10
2009–10	SaiPa	SM-l	58	10	34	44	20	—	—	—	—	—
2010–11	SaiPa	SM-l	43	6	30	36	24	—	—	—	—	—
2011–12	EHC Olten	SUI.2	23	6	15	21	6	—	—	—	—	—
2011–12	HIFK	SM-l	26	6	13	19	20	4	0	0	0	2
2012–13	HIFK	SM-l	23	3	9	12	12	—	—	—	—	—
2012–13	Pelicans	SM-l	20	4	11	15	16	—	—	—	—	—
2013–14	Pelicans	Liiga	47	3	33	36	18	8	1	4	5	2
2014–15	Pelicans	Liiga	40	6	23	29	30	—	—	—	—	—
2014–15	HC Davos	NLA	3	1	0	1	2	11	0	4	4	0
2015–16	HC ČSOB Pojišťovna Pardubice	ELH	41	9	16	25	12	—	—	—	—	—
2016–17	HC Dynamo Pardubice	ELH	34	11	22	33	32	—	—	—	—	—
2016–17	HC Oceláři Třinec	ELH	9	2	3	5	4	4	0	0	0	0
2017–18	Tappara	Liiga	10	1	0	1	4	—	—	—	—	—
2017–18	Bílí Tygři Liberec	ELH	42	12	9	21	10	10	3	2	5	6
2018–19	Bílí Tygři Liberec	ELH	50	9	9	18	12	17	4	3	7	14
2019–20	Oji Eagles	ALH	34	10	15	25	89	3	2	0	2	0
AHL totals			155	35	59	94	74	—	—	—	—	—
SM-l/Liiga totals			267	39	153	192	144	12	1	4	5	4
ELH totals			176	43	59	102	70	31	7	5	12	20

== Awards and honours ==
Awards	Year
WHL
East Second All-Star Team	2004
