= Kevin Nastiuk =

Ukrainian-Canadian ice hockey player (born 1985)

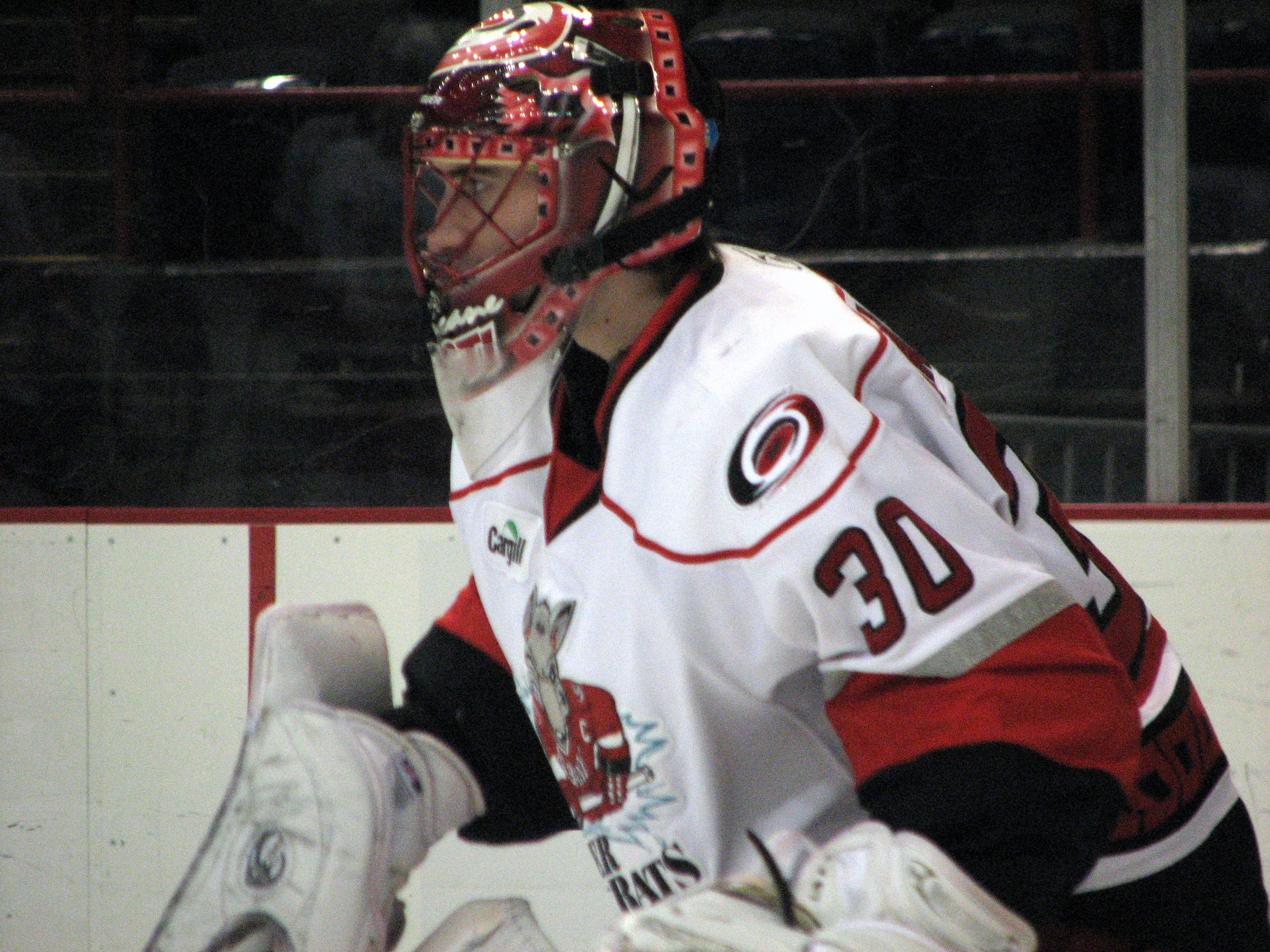
- Nastiuk with the Albany River Rats in 2011
- Born: July 20, 1985 (age 41) Edmonton, Alberta, Canada
- Height: 6 ft 1 in (185 cm)
- Weight: 181 lb (82 kg; 12 st 13 lb)
- Position: Goaltender
- Caught: Left
- Played for: Lowell Lock Monsters; Albany River Rats; Providence Bruins; Eisbären Berlin; Dresdner Eislöwen; Coventry Blaze; Stony Plain Eagles
- NHL draft: 126th overall, 2003; Carolina Hurricanes
- Playing career: 2005–2020

Kevin Nastiuk (born July 20, 1985) is a Ukrainian Canadian former professional ice hockey goaltender.

== Playing career ==
Nastiuk played junior hockey with the Medicine Hat Tigers from 2001 through 2005 and was drafted in the fourth round of the 2003 NHL entry draft by the Carolina Hurricanes. Nastiuk had played for several teams in the American Hockey League, ECHL and Central Hockey League before joining Eisbären Berlin in the later stages of the 2009–10 DEL season.

He stayed until 2012 and then signed with German second-division side Heilbronner Falken for the 2012-13 campaign. For the following season, he moved to fellow DEL2 club Dresdner Eislöwen, where he spent two years, before returning to Eisbären Berlin of the Deutsche Eishockey Liga in July 2015.

Nastiuk also played for Dresdner Eislöwen of the DEL2 in Germany, before moving to the UK to sign for EIHL side Coventry Blaze in June 2017.

== Awards ==
- 2004 – WHL airBC Trophy
- 2005 – WHL East Second All-Star Team

Awards
Preceded by Jesse Schultz	Winner of the WHL airBC Trophy; 2004	Succeeded by Shea Weber
