= Nikita Korovkin =

Russian ice hockey player

- Born: December 3, 1983 (age 42) Zlatoust, Russian SFSR, Soviet Union
- Height: 6 ft 2 in (188 cm)
- Weight: 198 lb (90 kg; 14 st 2 lb)
- Position: Defence
- Shot: Right
- Played for: Traktor Chelyabinsk; HC Vityaz; Amur Khabarovsk
- NHL draft: 192nd overall, 2002; Philadelphia Flyers
- Playing career: 2004–2014

Nikita Korovkin (born December 3, 1983) is a former Russian professional ice hockey defenceman who played in the Russian Superleague and Kontinental Hockey League (KHL). He was selected by the Philadelphia Flyers in the 6th round (192nd overall) of the 2002 NHL entry draft.

== Career statistics ==
			Regular season					Playoffs
Season	Team	League	GP	G	A	Pts	PIM	GP	G	A	Pts	PIM
1999–2000	Traktor–2 Chelyabinsk	RUS.3	17	0	1	1	10	—	—	—	—	—
2000–01	Kamloops Blazers	WHL	46	3	1	4	58	1	0	0	0	0
2001–02	Kamloops Blazers	WHL	72	4	23	27	103	1	0	0	0	2
2002–03	Kamloops Blazers	WHL	63	12	17	29	64	2	0	0	0	0
2003–04	Kamloops Blazers	WHL	2	0	0	0	0	—	—	—	—	—
2003–04	Tri–City Americans	WHL	63	14	30	44	80	11	2	6	8	10
2004–05	San Diego Gulls	ECHL	64	8	13	21	58	—	—	—	—	—
2004–05	Syracuse Crunch	AHL	2	0	0	0	4	—	—	—	—	—
2005–06	San Diego Gulls	ECHL	70	7	13	20	124	3	0	0	0	4
2006–07	Phoenix RoadRunners	ECHL	6	1	1	2	12	—	—	—	—	—
2006–07	Pensacola Ice Pilots	ECHL	61	5	15	20	88	—	—	—	—	—
2007–08	Traktor Chelyabinsk	RSL	29	1	2	3	38	3	0	0	0	6
2008–09	Traktor Chelyabinsk	KHL	51	1	6	7	87	2	0	0	0	2
2009–10	Traktor Chelyabinsk	KHL	54	1	3	4	72	4	1	0	1	2
2010–11	Traktor Chelyabinsk	KHL	33	0	6	6	22	—	—	—	—	—
2011–12	Vityaz Chekhov	KHL	39	0	6	6	57	—	—	—	—	—
2012–13	Amur Khabarovsk	KHL	25	0	0	0	49	—	—	—	—	—
2013–14	Vityaz Podolsk	KHL	17	0	1	1	8	—	—	—	—	—
ECHL totals			201	21	42	63	282	3	0	0	0	4
KHL totals			219	2	22	24	295	6	1	0	1	4
