= Mike Brodeur =

Canadian ice hockey player

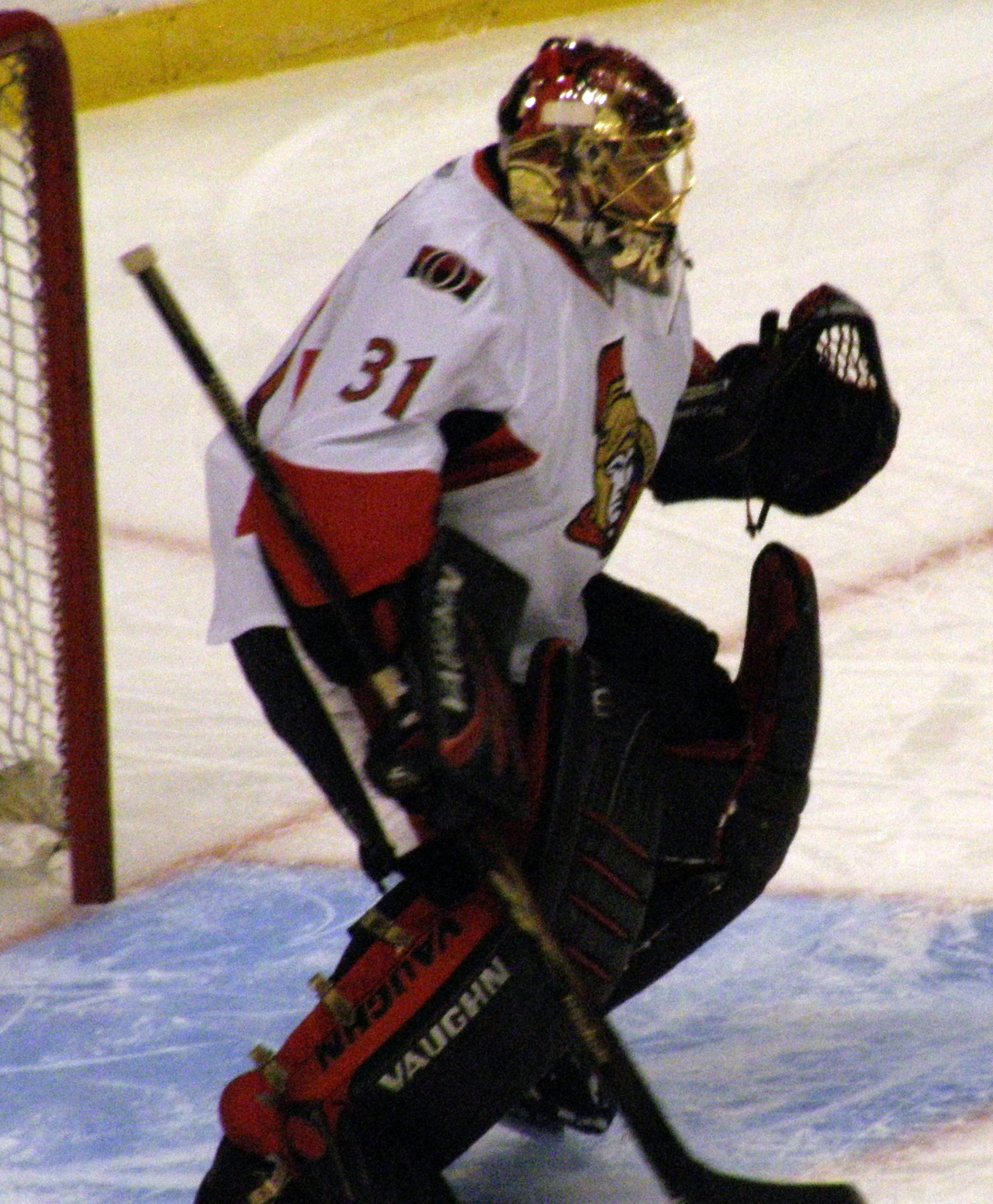
- Brodeur with the Ottawa Senators in 2009
- Born: March 30, 1983 (age 43) Calgary, Alberta, Canada
- Height: 6 ft 2 in (188 cm)
- Weight: 185 lb (84 kg; 13 st 3 lb)
- Position: Goaltender
- Caught: Left
- Played for: Ottawa Senators
- NHL draft: 211th overall, 2003; Chicago Blackhawks
- Playing career: 2004–2017

Mike Brodeur (born March 30, 1983) is a Canadian former professional ice hockey goaltender. He was selected by the Chicago Blackhawks in the 2003 NHL entry draft and played in the National Hockey League (NHL) with the Ottawa Senators.

== Playing career ==
Brodeur had a breakout AHL campaign with the Rochester Americans in 2008–09 when he posted an 18-13-4 record with a 2.45 goals against average and .921 save percentage, all career bests.

Brodeur signed a one-year contract with the NHL Ottawa Senators during the summer of 2009, but at training camp, Brodeur was returned to the AHL, and assigned to the Binghamton Senators. Brodeur was recalled to Ottawa on November 24, 2009, after an injury to the Senators' starting goaltender Pascal Leclaire. He made his NHL debut on December 19, 2009, against the Minnesota Wild, stopping 22 shots and backstopping Ottawa to a 4–1 win. He was returned to Binghamton afterwards. On January 14, 2010, Brodeur was called up from Binghamton only hours before the opening faceoff for the Ottawa Senators. Brodeur made 32 stops for a 2–0 shutout of the New York Rangers in only his second-ever NHL game. Brodeur finished his NHL career appearing in 7 games over two seasons, with a record of 3 wins and 1 loss.

On March 15, 2012, Brodeur signed with the Las Vegas Wranglers of the ECHL. March 23 was his first full game in more than a year following offseason hip surgery. He lost that game to the Idaho Steelheads, 3–2, in a shootout.

== Personal life ==
Brodeur is married. He is a distant relative of former New Jersey Devils goaltender Martin Brodeur.

He lost his home in the Alberta 2016 Fort McMurray wildfire forest fire near Fort McMurray in May 2016.

== Career statistics ==
=== Regular season and playoffs ===
			Regular season										Playoffs
Season	Team	League	GP	W	L	T	OTL	MIN	GA	SO	GAA	SV%	GP	W	L	MIN	GA	SO	GAA	SV%
2000–01	Calgary Flames AAA	AMHL	21	11	8	3	—	1231	54	1	2.63	.910	10	6	4	620	31	0	3.00	—
2001–02	Camrose Kodiaks	AJHL	24	13	9	1	—	1299	65	1	2.91	—	8	—	—	—	—	—	3.61	.903
2002–03	Camrose Kodiaks	AJHL	48	28	16	2	—	2570	113	2	2.64	—	21	16	5	1378	48	4	2.09	—
2003–04	Moose Jaw Warriors	WHL	41	23	12	5	—	2385	84	5	2.11	.929	10	6	4	624	18	1	1.73	.935
2004–05	Norfolk Admirals	AHL	1	0	1	0	—	39	4	0	6.17	.733	—	—	—	—	—	—	—	—
2004–05	Greenville Grrrowl	ECHL	35	19	15	1	—	2081	93	2	2.68	.927	5	2	3	302	10	1	1.98	.944
2005–06	Greenville Grrrowl	ECHL	24	14	8	—	2	1466	63	1	2.58	.916	—	—	—	—	—	—	—	—
2006–07	Norfolk Admirals	AHL	10	4	3	—	0	495	28	0	3.39	.891	1	0	0	8	0	2	14.17	.667
2006–07	Augusta Lynx	ECHL	2	2	0	—	0	120	4	1	2.00	.905	—	—	—	—	—	—	—	—
2006–07	Toledo Storm	ECHL	5	3	2	—	0	300	10	2	2.00	.938	—	—	—	—	—	—	—	—
2007–08	Rockford IceHogs	AHL	8	2	3	—	0	341	16	0	2.81	.904	—	—	—	—	—	—	—	—
2007–08	Pensacola Ice Pilots	ECHL	26	10	9	—	5	1504	71	1	2.83	.918	—	—	—	—	—	—	—	—
2008–09	Rochester Americans	AHL	38	18	13	—	4	2127	87	2	2.45	.920	—	—	—	—	—	—	—	—
2008–09	Augusta Lynx	ECHL	8	2	4	—	1	457	23	1	3.02	.919	—	—	—	—	—	—	—	—
2009–10	Ottawa Senators	NHL	3	3	0	—	0	180	3	1	1.00	.966	—	—	—	—	—	—	—	—
2009–10	Binghamton Senators	AHL	36	13	13	—	2	1881	96	2	3.06	.899	—	—	—	—	—	—	—	—
2010–11	Ottawa Senators	NHL	4	0	1	—	0	97	7	0	4.34	.833	—	—	—	—	—	—	—	—
2010–11	Binghamton Senators	AHL	9	3	5	—	0	466	23	0	2.96	.903	—	—	—	—	—	—	—	—
2010–11	Elmira Jackals	ECHL	4	3	1	—	0	232	10	1	2.59	.912	—	—	—	—	—	—	—	—
2011–12	Las Vegas Wranglers	ECHL	2	0	0	—	1	85	4	0	2.82	.882	—	—	—	—	—	—	—	—
2011–12	Houston Aeros	AHL	—	—	—	—	—	—	—	—	—	—	4	1	1	175	7	1	2.40	.917
2012–13	Orlando Solar Bears	ECHL	2	0	1	—	1	125	9	0	4.32	.816	—	—	—	—	—	—	—	—
2016–17	Innisfail Eagles	ChHL	1	—	—	—	—	—	—	—	6.00	.846	—	—	—	—	—	—	—	—
NHL totals			7	3	1	—	0	277	10	1	2.17	.922	—	—	—	—	—	—	—	—
