= Ryan Kinasewich =

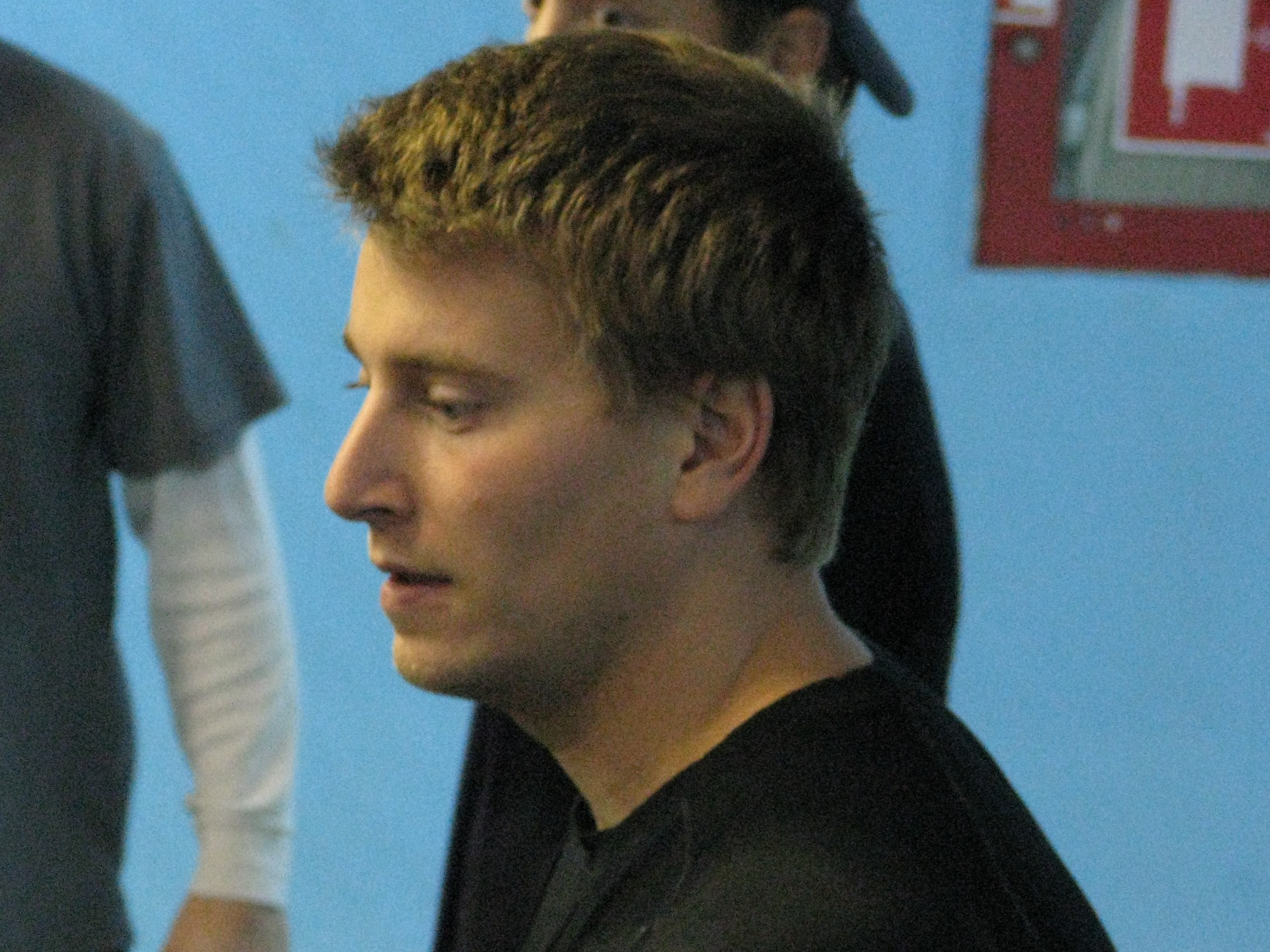
- Born: August 20, 1983 (age 41); St. Albert, Alberta, Canada
- Height: 6 ft 2 in (188 cm)
- Weight: 203 lb (92 kg; 14 st 7 lb)
- Position: Left wing
- Shot: Left
- Played for: Manchester Monarchs; Bridgeport Sound Tigers; Lake Erie Monsters; Hamilton Bulldogs; KHL Medveščak; EC Red Bull Salzburg; Milano Rossoblu; Graz 99ers Dornbirner EC; Alba Volán Székesfehérvár; Pingouins de Morzine-Avoriaz
- National team: Croatia
- NHL draft: Undrafted
- Playing career: 2004–2017

Ryan Kinasewich (born August 20, 1983) is a Croatian-Canadian former professional ice hockey forward who played most notably in the American Hockey League (AHL), the ECHL, and the Austrian Erste Bank Eishockey Liga (EBEL). As of 2021, he is the head coach the Utah Grizzlies in the ECHL.

== Career ==
Kinasewich was originally selected in the third round, 37th overall, in the 1998 WHL Bantam Draft joining first overall draft pick, Jay Bouwmeester at the Medicine Hat Tigers. After two full seasons with the Tigers, Ryan then joined the Tri-City Americans from the 2001–02 season and contributed 39 goals with the Americans in the following year.

As an undrafted free agent, after completing his junior career, Kinasewich made his professional debut in the 2004–05 season, signing with the Reading Royals of the ECHL. After earning player of the week in the ECHL at the turn of the year, Ryan played in the ECHL All-Star game and later made his debut in the American Hockey League, signing a professional try-out agreement with the Manchester Monarchs, affiliate of the Los Angeles Kings.

Starting the 2005–06 season on the sidelines with injury, Kinasewich was later traded by the Royals to fellow ECHL team, the Utah Grizzlies. In addition to leading the Grizzlies with 85 points in 60 games, Ryan also co-led the ECHL in goals with 39. He stayed in the ECHL the following year, initially signing back with the Royals before he was returned to Utah in a trade prior to the 2006–07 season. He again led the Grizzlies in scoring with 29 goals and 59 points despite sustaining a season-ending injury on February 14, 2007, against the Fresno Falcons.

During the 2007–08 season, Kinasewich was signed by the Bridgeport Sound Tigers, the AHL affiliate of the Grizzlies' NHL affiliate, the New York Islanders, on a try-out. In 24 games, Kinasewich posted five points before returning to co-lead the Grizzlies with 60 points, including scoring a Grizzlies record of six points in a game (1 goal and 5 assists) in a 6–5 victory against the Phoenix RoadRunners on January 16, 2008. In 2008–09, Kinasewich remained in the ECHL with the Grizzlies with stints in the AHL with the Lake Erie Monsters and the Hamilton Bulldogs before recovering from a supposed season-ending injury suffered in February to re-join the Grizzlies in the playoffs.

On September 8, 2009, he re-signed to a one-year contract to captain the Grizzlies for the 2009–10 season. On October 24, 2009, Kinaeswich scored two goals in a 5–3 defeat to the Idaho Steelheads to tie and surpass Chris Taylor as the Grizzlies' all-time goal scoring leader. Two weeks later, Kinasewich posted a five-point night (3 goals and 2 assists) in an 8–3 rout of the Las Vegas Wranglers, to again surpass Taylor's 278 points as the franchise scoring leader on November 14. After 27 points in 12 games, he was signed to an AHL try-out contract with the Bulldogs on November 16, 2009. After five scoreless games in the AHL with the Bulldogs, and a four-point contribution in a brief return to the Sound Tigers, he primarily remained with Utah. He tied Kip Miller for most goals in a Grizzlies season, leading the ECHL with 48 goals and scoring 103 points in just 59 games. Named as a starter to the ECHL All-Star Game and selected to the ECHL first All-Star Team, Kinaeswich was also named as the only runner-up as the ECHL MVP. After five years, Kinasewich finished his prolific scoring tenure with the Grizzlies as the franchise record holder in goals (156), assists (200) and points (356).

Unable to establish himself above the ECHL level, on July 4, 2010, Kinasewich of Croatian descent left North America and signed a one-year contract as a free agent with Croatian team, KHL Medveščak Zagreb, of the Erste Bank Eishockey Liga (EBEL). After leading Zagreb for a second consecutive year in scoring with 54 points in 49 games, Kinasewich signed with fellow EBEL team, EC Red Bull Salzburg, on May 11, 2012.

Kinasewich's stay with Red Bull in the 2012–13 season was short lived as he was mutually released from his contract after 14 games. On October 31, 2012, he signed for the remainder of the season in Italy with Milano Rossoblu.

Upon the conclusion of his tenure with Milan, Kinasewich opted to return to the EBEL for the following season, signing an optional two-year contract with Graz 99ers on April 25, 2013.

After finishing his professional career, Kinasewich played in the Chinook Hockey League with the Lacombe Generals for the 2016–17 season. He ended his playing career and accepted an assistant coaching role with former club, the Utah Grizzlies of the ECHL, for the 2017–18 season. In 2021, he was named the head coach of the Grizzlies.

== Career statistics ==
=== Regular season and playoffs ===
			Regular season					Playoffs
Season	Team	League	GP	G	A	Pts	PIM	GP	G	A	Pts	PIM
1998–99	Medicine Hat Tigers	WHL	3	0	0	0	2	—	—	—	—	—
1999–00	Medicine Hat Tigers	WHL	47	3	10	13	19	—	—	—	—	—
2000–01	Medicine Hat Tigers	WHL	66	12	20	32	36	—	—	—	—	—
2001–02	Tri-City Americans	WHL	61	19	28	47	43	5	0	0	0	4
2002–03	Tri-City Americans	WHL	66	39	52	91	87	—	—	—	—	—
2003–04	Tri-City Americans	WHL	55	33	36	69	45	11	7	5	12	0
2004–05	Reading Royals	ECHL	43	16	22	38	26	5	1	5	6	2
2004–05	Manchester Monarchs	AHL	29	2	6	8	4	—	—	—	—	—
2005–06	Utah Grizzlies	ECHL	60	39	46	85	48	4	2	0	2	2
2006–07	Utah Grizzlies	ECHL	44	29	30	59	47	—	—	—	—	—
2007–08	Utah Grizzlies	ECHL	44	23	37	60	48	12	8	4	12	20
2007–08	Bridgeport Sound Tigers	AHL	24	3	2	5	12	—	—	—	—	—
2008–09	Utah Grizzlies	ECHL	32	17	32	49	48	5	0	0	0	12
2008–09	Lake Erie Monsters	AHL	1	0	0	0	0	—	—	—	—	—
2008–09	Hamilton Bulldogs	AHL	7	1	1	2	2	—	—	—	—	—
2009–10	Utah Grizzlies	ECHL	59	48	55	103	70	9	6	3	9	8
2009–10	Hamilton Bulldogs	AHL	5	0	0	0	0	—	—	—	—	—
2009–10	Bridgeport Sound Tigers	AHL	5	2	2	4	2	—	—	—	—	—
2010–11	KHL Medveščak	EBEL	49	30	29	59	16	5	1	4	5	2
2011–12	KHL Medveščak	EBEL	49	25	29	54	16	9	2	4	6	4
2012–13	EC Red Bull Salzburg	EBEL	14	4	7	11	6	—	—	—	—	—
2012–13	Milano Rossoblu	ITL	25	16	10	26	14	6	3	2	5	0
2013–14	Graz 99ers	EBEL	28	13	11	24	14	—	—	—	—	—
2014–15	Dornbirner EC	EBEL	10	4	6	10	2	—	—	—	—	—
2015–16	Alba Volán Székesfehérvár	EBEL	10	2	3	5	6	—	—	—	—	—
2015–16	Pingouins de Morzine-Avoriaz	FRA	11	7	4	11	8	—	—	—	—	—
2016–17	Lacombe Generals	ChHL	22	9	16	25	6	8	2	5	7	12
AHL totals			71	8	11	19	20	—	—	—	—	—

=== International ===
Year	Team	Event	Result	GP	G	A	Pts	PIM
2015	Croatia	WC-D1	16th	5	4	2	6	0
Senior totals				5	4	2	6	0

== Awards and honours ==
Award	Year
WHL
West First All-Star Team	2004
ECHL
ECHL Most Goals	2005–06, 2009–10
First All-Star Team	2009–10
