= Moose Jaw Warriors =

Western Hockey League team in Saskatchewan, Canada

- City: Moose Jaw, Saskatchewan
- League: Western Hockey League
- Conference: Eastern
- Division: East
- Founded: 1980
- Home arena: Temple Gardens Centre
- Colours: Red, white, black
- General manager: Jason Ripplinger
- Head coach: Mark O'Leary
- Website: chl.ca/whl-warriors/

Franchise history
- 1980–1984: Winnipeg Warriors
- 1984–present: Moose Jaw Warriors

Championships
- Regular season titles: 1 (2017–18)
- Playoff championships: Ed Chynoweth Cup; 1 (2024); Conference Championships; 2 (2005–06, 2023–24)

Current uniform

The Moose Jaw Warriors are a Canadian major junior ice hockey team based in Moose Jaw, Saskatchewan. The Warriors play in the East Division of the Western Hockey League's Eastern Conference, hosting games at the Temple Gardens Centre. The team was founded in 1980 as the Winnipeg Warriors, and relocated to Moose Jaw in 1984. The Warriors won their first league championship in 2024.

== History ==
The Moose Jaw Canucks were a founding franchise of the then-Western Canada Hockey League in 1966, and were the new league's first champion. However, after just two seasons and with the WCHL barred by the Canadian Amateur Hockey Association (CAHA) from competing for the Memorial Cup, the Canucks opted to return to the revived Saskatchewan Junior Hockey League in 1968. When the WCHL became recognized by CAHA in 1970, Moose Jaw was left without top-level junior hockey.

The Warriors franchise was established as the Winnipeg Warriors prior to the start of the 1980–81 WHL season, and played out of Winnipeg Arena, which they shared with the National Hockey League's Winnipeg Jets. In 1984, the franchise relocated to Moose Jaw, bringing major junior hockey back to the city for the first time since 1970.

The Warriors played in the Moose Jaw Civic Centre, also known as "The Crushed Can", for 26 seasons, before moving to Mosaic Place, now the Moose Jaw Events Centre, in the city centre in 2011.

The team's first few seasons in Moose Jaw saw Theoren Fleury emerge as the team's primary star—Fleury finished among the top five scorers in the WHL during his tenure with the team. Led by Fleury, Kelly Buchberger, Mike Keane, and Lyle Odelein, the Warriors made the franchise's first playoff appearance after the relocation during the 1985–86 season. The team captured its first regular season division title in 2003–04. In 2005–06, led by Troy Brouwer and Dustin Boyd, the Warriors followed their best regular season with their first ever trip to the championship series, in which they were swept by the Vancouver Giants. In 2017–18, the Warriors captured their first Scotty Munro Memorial Trophy as regular season champions with their first 50-win and 100-point season, before bowing out in the second round of the playoffs to the eventual champion Swift Current Broncos.

In the 2023–24 season—the Warriors' 40th in Moose Jaw—the Warriors won their first Ed Chynoweth Cup as league champions. Led by Jagger Firkus, Denton Mateychuk, and Brayden Yager, the Warriors advanced to their second league final by defeating the regular-season champion Saskatoon Blades in a seven game series that featured a WHL-record six overtime games, including the seventh and deciding game. In the final, they won four straight games versus the Portland Winterhawks to secure the championship and a berth in the 2024 Memorial Cup tournament. At their first Memorial Cup, the Warriors advanced to the semi-final, where they were eliminated by the host and eventual champion Saginaw Spirit.

== Logo and uniforms ==
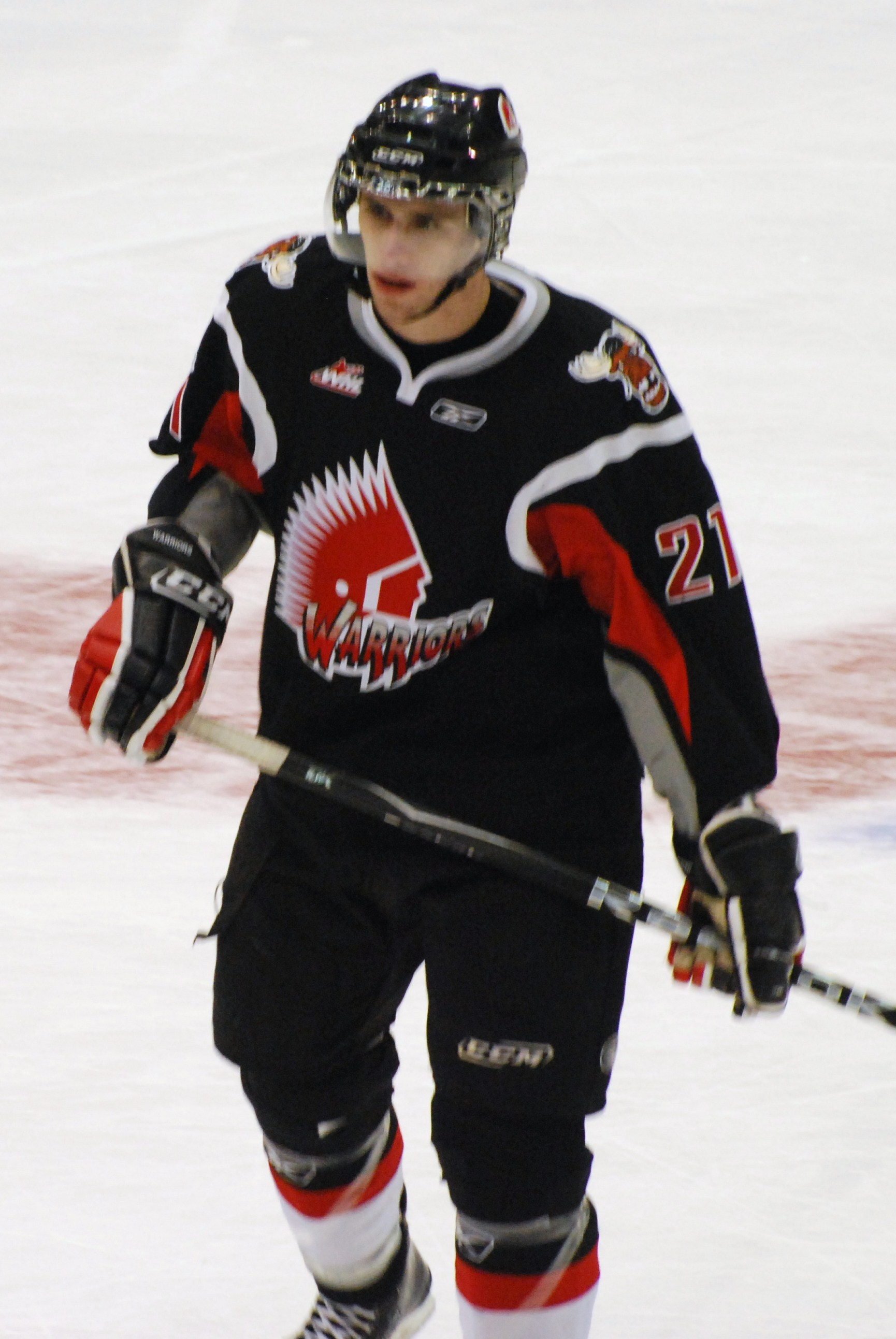
Quinton Howden with the Warriors in 2010.

The Warriors' original branding, based on the founding franchise in Winnipeg, featured Indigenous imagery, including a long-used logo featuring a silhouetted side-profile of a head wearing an Indigenous headdress. In 2020, in light of the Native American mascot controversy, the Warriors announced that they were reviewing their branding. In 2022, the team unveiled a new brand and logo based on the city's aviation history and connection with the Royal Canadian Air Force and Snowbirds—the logo features a CT-114 Tutor jet emblazoned with the Snowbirds logo. The team retained its original colour scheme featuring red, black, and white.

== Season-by-season record ==
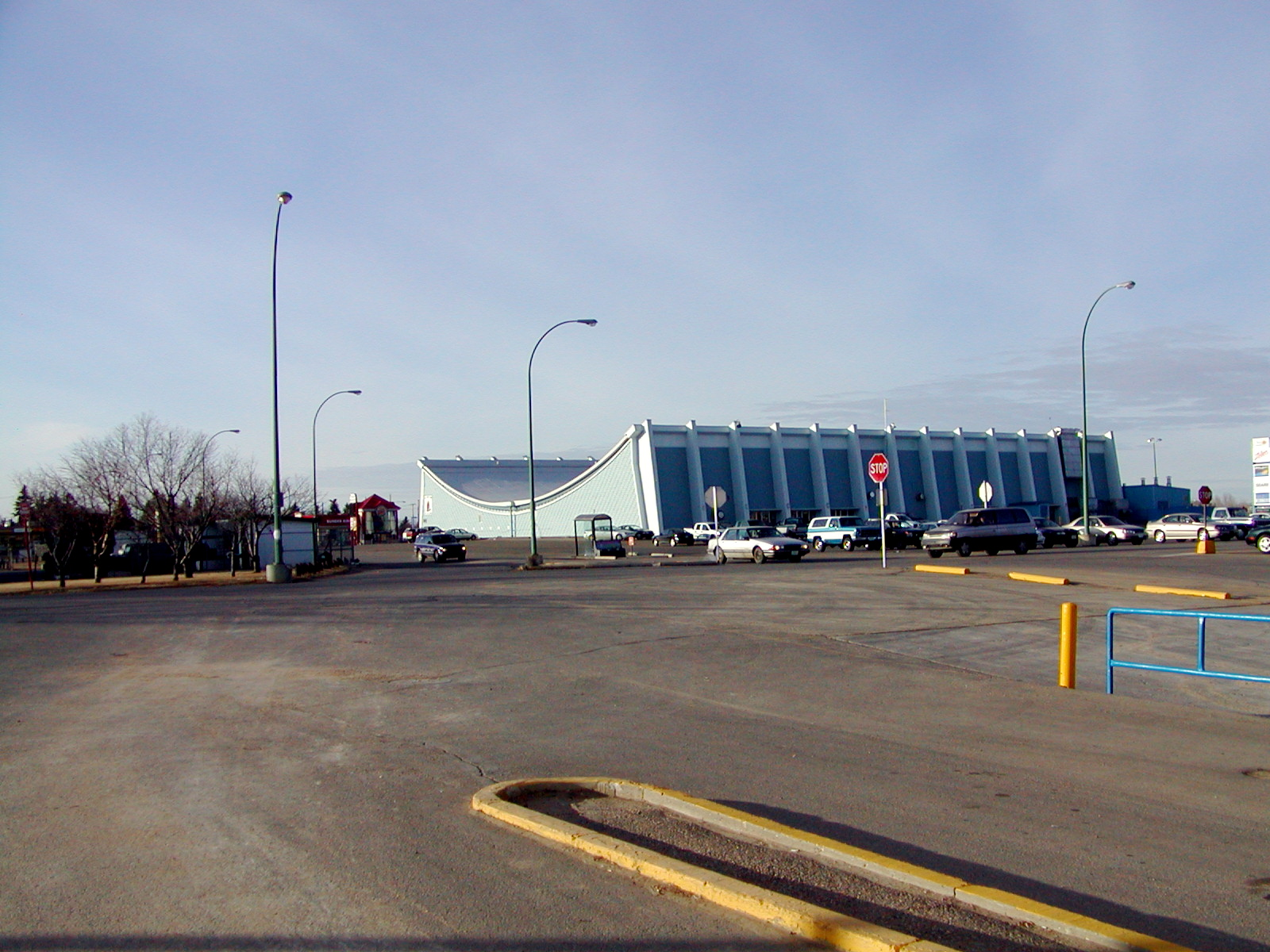
The Warriors played out of the Moose Jaw Civic Centre—dubbed the "Crushed Can"—from 1984 until 2010.

Note: GP = Games played, W = Wins, L = Losses, T = Ties OTL = Overtime losses Pts = Points, GF = Goals for, GA = Goals against

Season	GP	W	L	T	OTL	GF	GA	Points	Finish	Playoffs
1984–85	72	21	50	1	–	320	438	43	7th East	Did not qualify
1985–86	72	25	44	3	–	294	375	53	6th East	Lost East Division semifinal
1986–87	72	38	31	3	–	366	321	79	4th East	Lost East Division semifinal
1987–88	72	18	52	2	–	308	458	38	8th East	Did not qualify
1988–89	72	27	42	3	–	318	372	57	6th East	Lost East Division semifinal
1989–90	72	28	41	3	–	287	330	59	8th East	Did not qualify
1990–91	72	31	39	2	–	336	369	64	6th East	Lost East Division semifinal
1991–92	72	33	36	3	–	279	316	69	6th East	Lost East Division quarterfinal
1992–93	72	27	42	3	–	277	346	57	8th East	Did not qualify
1993–94	72	21	48	3	–	269	361	45	9th East	Did not qualify
1994–95	72	39	32	1	–	315	275	79	4th East	Lost East Division semifinal
1995–96	72	18	49	5	–	223	331	41	6th East	Did not qualify
1996–97	72	36	29	7	–	278	240	79	4th East	Lost East Division semifinal
1997–98	72	23	39	10	–	235	281	56	5th East	Lost Eastern Conference quarterfinal
1998–99	72	39	31	2	–	292	262	80	3rd East	Lost Eastern Conference semifinal
1999–00	72	25	34	9	4	221	259	63	3rd East	Lost Eastern Conference quarterfinal
2000–01	72	34	29	4	5	287	291	77	3rd East	Lost Eastern Conference quarterfinal
2001–02	72	30	34	6	2	226	239	68	3rd East	Lost Eastern Conference semifinal
2002–03	72	36	22	11	3	266	208	86	2nd East	Lost Eastern Conference semifinal
2003–04	72	41	22	8	1	209	172	91	1st East	Lost Eastern Conference semifinal
2004–05	72	14	47	10	1	182	282	39	4th East	Lost Eastern Conference quarterfinal
Season	GP	W	L	OTL	SOL	GF	GA	Points	Finish	Playoffs
2005–06	72	44	20	5	3	278	205	96	1st East	Lost final
2006–07	72	28	41	3	0	217	271	59	5th East	Did not qualify
2007–08	72	37	21	6	8	229	214	88	4th East	Lost Eastern Conference quarterfinal
2008–09	72	19	50	1	2	198	352	41	6th East	Did not qualify
2009–10	72	33	27	5	8	243	247	78	4th East	Lost Eastern Conference quarterfinal
2010–11	72	40	26	2	4	245	240	86	2nd East	Lost Eastern Conference quarterfinal
2011–12	72	45	19	6	2	258	213	98	1st East	Lost Eastern Conference final
2012–13	72	25	36	4	7	182	249	61	4th East	Did not qualify
2013–14	72	21	42	3	6	202	283	51	5th East	Did not qualify
2014–15	72	32	35	4	1	221	266	69	4th East	Did not qualify
2015–16	72	36	27	7	2	249	231	81	3rd East	Lost Eastern Conference semifinal
2016–17	72	42	21	8	1	255	219	93	2nd East	Lost Eastern Conference quarterfinal
2017–18	72	52	15	2	3	326	216	109	1st East	Lost Eastern Conference semifinal
2018–19	68	40	20	6	2	234	192	88	3rd East	Lost Eastern Conference quarterfinal
2019–20	62	14	44	4	0	146	291	32	6th East	Cancelled due to the COVID-19 pandemic
2020–21	24	8	13	3	0	71	95	19	6th East	No playoffs were held due to COVID-19 pandemic
2021–22	68	37	24	4	3	251	221	81	2nd East	Lost Eastern Conference semifinal
2022–23	68	41	24	0	3	252	237	85	3rd East	Lost Eastern Conference semifinal
2023–24	68	44	21	0	3	297	228	91	2nd East	Won Championship
2024–25	68	15	45	6	2	189	308	38	6th East	Did not qualify
2025–26	68	25	36	5	2	234	296	57	5th East	Did not qualify

== Championship history ==
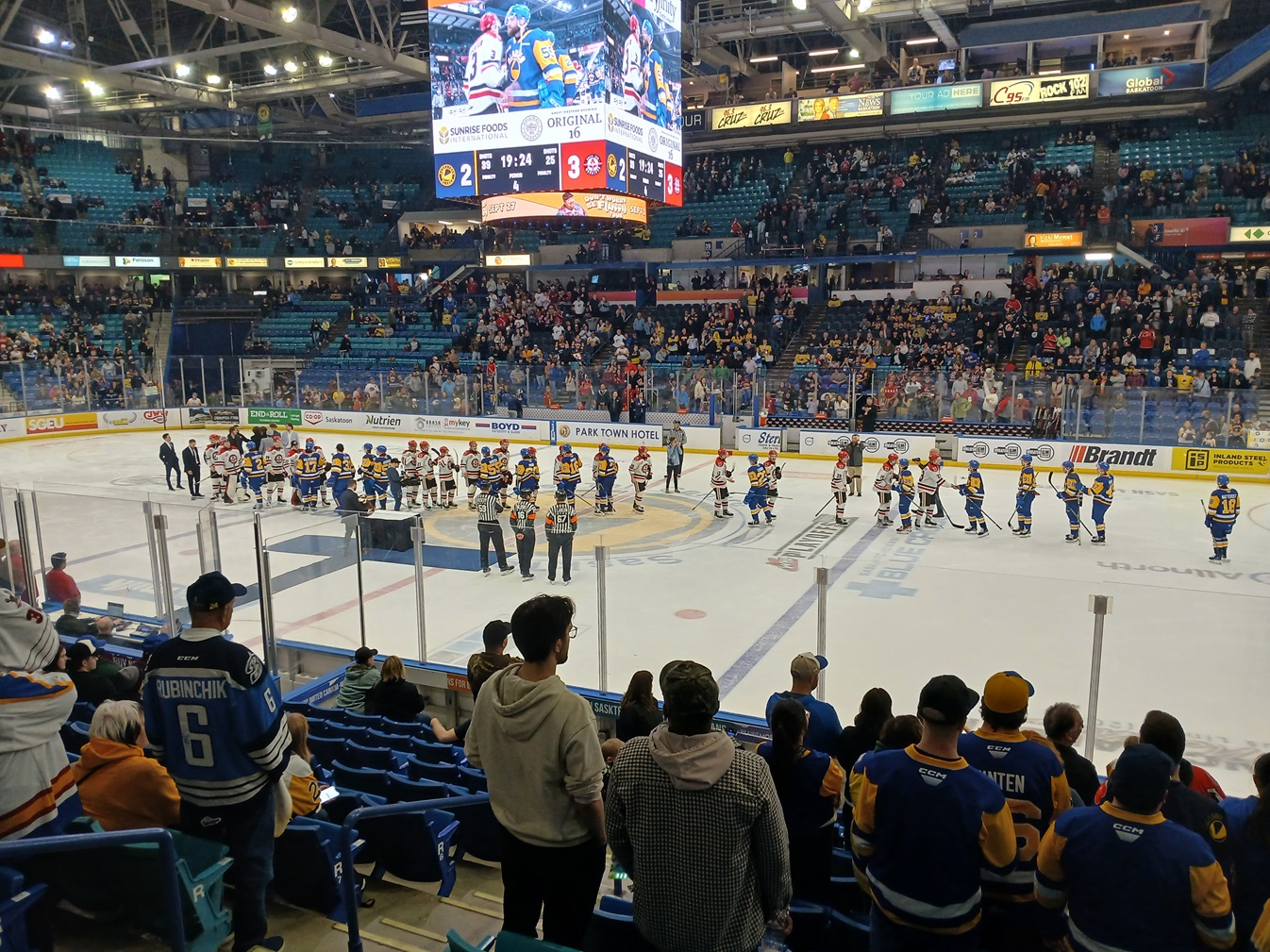
The Warriors shake hands with the Saskatoon Blades after winning the 2024 Eastern Conference Championship in overtime of game 7.

- Ed Chynoweth Cup (1): 2023–24
- Scotty Munro Memorial Trophy (1): 2017–18
- Regular Season Division titles (4): 2003–04, 2005–06, 2011–12, 2017–18
- Conference Championships (2): 2005–06, 2023–24

=== WHL Championship ===
- 2005–06: Loss, 0–4 vs Vancouver Giants
- 2023–24: Win, 4–0 vs Portland Winterhawks

== Players ==
=== NHL alumni ===
The following Moose Jaw Warriors alumni have played in the National Hockey League (NHL).

- Chris Armstrong
- Blair Atcheynum
- Scott Bailey
- Lonny Bohonos
- Johnny Boychuk
- Dustin Boyd
- Mike Brodeur
- Kyle Brodziak
- Troy Brouwer
- Curtis Brown
- Kelly Buchberger
- Frederic Chabot
- Joel Edmundson
- Deryk Engelland
- Tomas Fleischmann
- Theoren Fleury
- Owen Fussey
- Noah Gregor
- Travis Hamonic
- Matt Higgins
- Brett Howden
- Quinton Howden
- Daemon Hunt
- Tanner Jeannot
- Blair Jones
- Mike Keane
- Sheldon Kennedy
- Paul Kruse
- Pavel Kubina
- Dale Kushner
- Brooks Laich
- Darryl Laplante
- Reed Low
- Jamie Lundmark
- Masi Marjamaki
- Denton Mateychuk
- Jim McKenzie
- Tomas Mojzis
- Lyle Odelein
- Nathan Paetsch
- Brayden Point
- Dale Purinton
- Morgan Rielly
- Aaron Rome
- Jiri Smejkal
- Kevin Smyth
- Ryan Smyth
- Martin Spanhel
- Rastislav Stana
- Ryan Stanton
- Brian Sutherby
- Dave Thomlinson
- Ryan Tobler
- Roman Vopat
- Jason Widmer
- Brayden Yager

=== NLL alumni ===
Warriors alumnus Kaleb Toth played thirteen seasons in the National Lacrosse League for the Calgary Roughnecks and Toronto Rock; he was inducted into the Canadian Lacrosse Hall of Fame in 2022.

== Team records ==
Team records for a single season
Statistic	Total	Season
Most points	109	2017–18
Most wins	52	2017–18
Most goals for	366	1986–87
Fewest points for	32	2019–20
Fewest wins for	14	2004–05/2019–20
Fewest goals for	146	2019–20
Fewest goals against	172	2003–04
Most goals against	458	1987–88

Individual player records for a single season
Statistic	Player	Total	Season
Most goals	Blair Atcheynum	70	1988–89
Most assists	Theoren Fleury	92	1987–88
Most points	Theoren Fleury	160	1987–88
Most points, rookie	Mark MacKay	140	1984–85
Most points, defenceman	Scott Schoneck	76	1998–99
Best GAA (goalie)	Mike Brodeur	2.11	2003–04
Goalies = minimum 1500 minutes played

== Awards ==
Bob Clarke Trophy (WHL top scorer)

- Theoren Fleury: 1987–88 (tied with Joe Sakic, Swift Current Broncos)
- Troy Brouwer: 2005–06
- Jayden Halbgewachs: 2017–18
- Jagger Firkus: 2023–24

Four Broncos Memorial Trophy (WHL player of the year)

- Dryden Hunt: 2015–16
- Jagger Firkus: 2023–24

WHL Playoff MVP

- Denton Mateychuk: 2023–24

Bill Hunter Memorial Trophy (WHL top defenceman)

- Kale Clague: 2017–18
- Denton Mateychuk: 2023–24

Del Wilson Trophy (WHL top goaltender)

- Ken Brown: 1966–67

Jim Piggott Memorial Trophy (WHL rookie of the year)

- Mark MacKay: 1984–85
- Donovan Nunweiler: 1996–97
- Brayden Tracey: 2018–19
- Brayden Yager: 2021–22

Doc Seaman Trophy (WHL scholastic player of the year)

- Brennen Wray: 2005–06

Brad Hornung Trophy (WHL most sportsmanlike)

- Blair Atcheynum: 1988–89
- Jason Bast: 2009–10
- Justin Almeida: 2018–19
- Brayden Yager: 2022–23
- Brayden Yager: 2023–24

== See also ==
- List of ice hockey teams in Saskatchewan
- CILG (broadcasts Moose Jaw Warriors games)
- Ice hockey in Saskatchewan
