= Medicine Hat Arena =

Multi-purpose arena in Alberta, Canada

- Interactive map of Medicine Hat Arena
- Address: 155 Ash Avenue SE
- Location: Medicine Hat, Alberta, Canada
- Coordinates: 50.0439°N 110.6696°W
- Owner: City of Medicine Hat
- Operator: City of Medicine Hat
- Capacity: Hockey and maximum: 4,006

Construction
- Groundbreaking: 1968
- Opened: October 15, 1970
- Closed: July 2017

Tenant
- Medicine Hat Tigers (WHL) (1970–2015)

The Medicine Hat Arena is a 4,006-seat multi-purpose arena in Medicine Hat, Alberta, Canada. It was built in 1970 to replace Arena Gardens (Medicine Hat), the old rink that burned down in a fire where the Medicine Hat Inn is now situated. It was home to the Medicine Hat Tigers ice hockey team. In recent years, the building has received upgrades including new plastic seats to replace the rainbow wooden benches that nicknamed the rink "The Smartie Box". A new scoreboard, sound system, heating system, lighting system and front entrance have been added. The Tigers sold out every game for over five seasons, finally ending on March 29, 2008, when they played to a crowd of 3,788, 218 short of a sell-out.

The Tigers moved to the new Canalta Centre for the 2015-16 WHL season. The old arena was closed in July 2017 by Medicine Hat City Council.
