= Moose Jaw Civic Centre =

Canadian multi-purpose arena (1959–2012)

- The Crushed Can
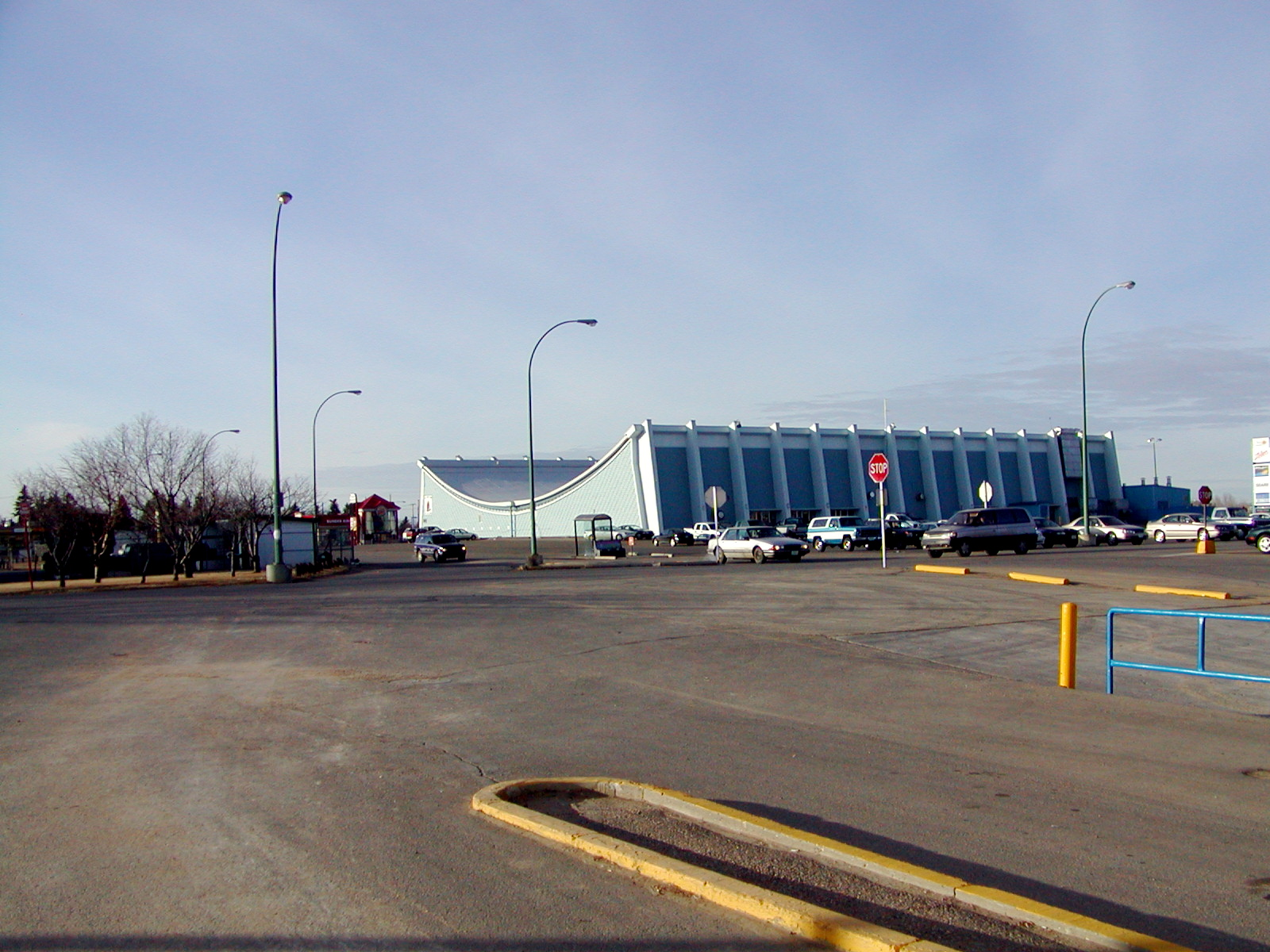
- Moose Jaw Civic Centre (2006)
- Interactive map of Moose Jaw Civic Centre
- Location: Main Street North and Civic Centre Drive, Moose Jaw, Saskatchewan, Canada
- Coordinates: 50°24′17.17″N 105°32′1.64″W
- Owner: City of Moose Jaw
- Capacity: 3,146

Construction
- Opened: September 19, 1959
- Closed: September 2011
- Demolished: August–November 2012
- Cost: $525,000
- Architect: Joseph Pettick
- Structural engineer: J.L. Miller

The Moose Jaw Civic Centre was a 3,146-seat multi-purpose arena located in Moose Jaw, Saskatchewan, Canada, and was home to the Moose Jaw Warriors junior ice hockey team. The building shared the same parking lot with the Town 'N' Country Mall, Moose Jaw's only indoor shopping centre.

Designed by Saskatchewan architect Joseph Pettick and Vancouver structural engineer J.L. Miller, the Civic Centre won the Massey Medal for architecture, a precursor to Canada's Governor General's Medals in Architecture. The innovative cable structure roof that gave the building its unique shape, was an ingenious and cost effective solution that allowed such a large building to be constructed on a modest budget, while maintaining an unobstructed view of the arena surface from all seats. At the time it was built it was the largest cable structure in Canada. It earned the nickname of "The Crushed Can" because of its unusual shape.

The impetus for the building was a fire that destroyed the old arena rink on Ross Street in the fall of 1955. City Council then appointed a group of citizens to oversee plans for a new building. The building was officially opened as The Moose Jaw Community Centre on September 19, 1959, with a gala event hosted by Saskatchewan Premier Tommy Douglas, and featuring a performance by Louis Armstrong & His All-Stars.

After initial tenders in the range of one million dollars, the length of the building was shortened, and the final cost was a mere $525,000.00. The building opened on budget and debt free. Current replacement cost of the building would be in the tens of millions of dollars.

Mosaic Place, completed in 2011, served as a replacement for the Moose Jaw Civic Centre. The City mothballed the Civic Centre in September 2011, and demolition was a possibility. Six private developers approached the city with plans to redevelop the building, and in April 2012 an agreement of sale was reached with Civic Centre Plaza Inc. However, the plans unveiled on May 29, 2012, showed the original building being demolished and replaced with several new buildings that mimic the Civic Centre's roofline. Demolition work commenced in August 2012 and was largely completed by November.
