= Drayson Bowman =

American ice hockey player (born 1989)

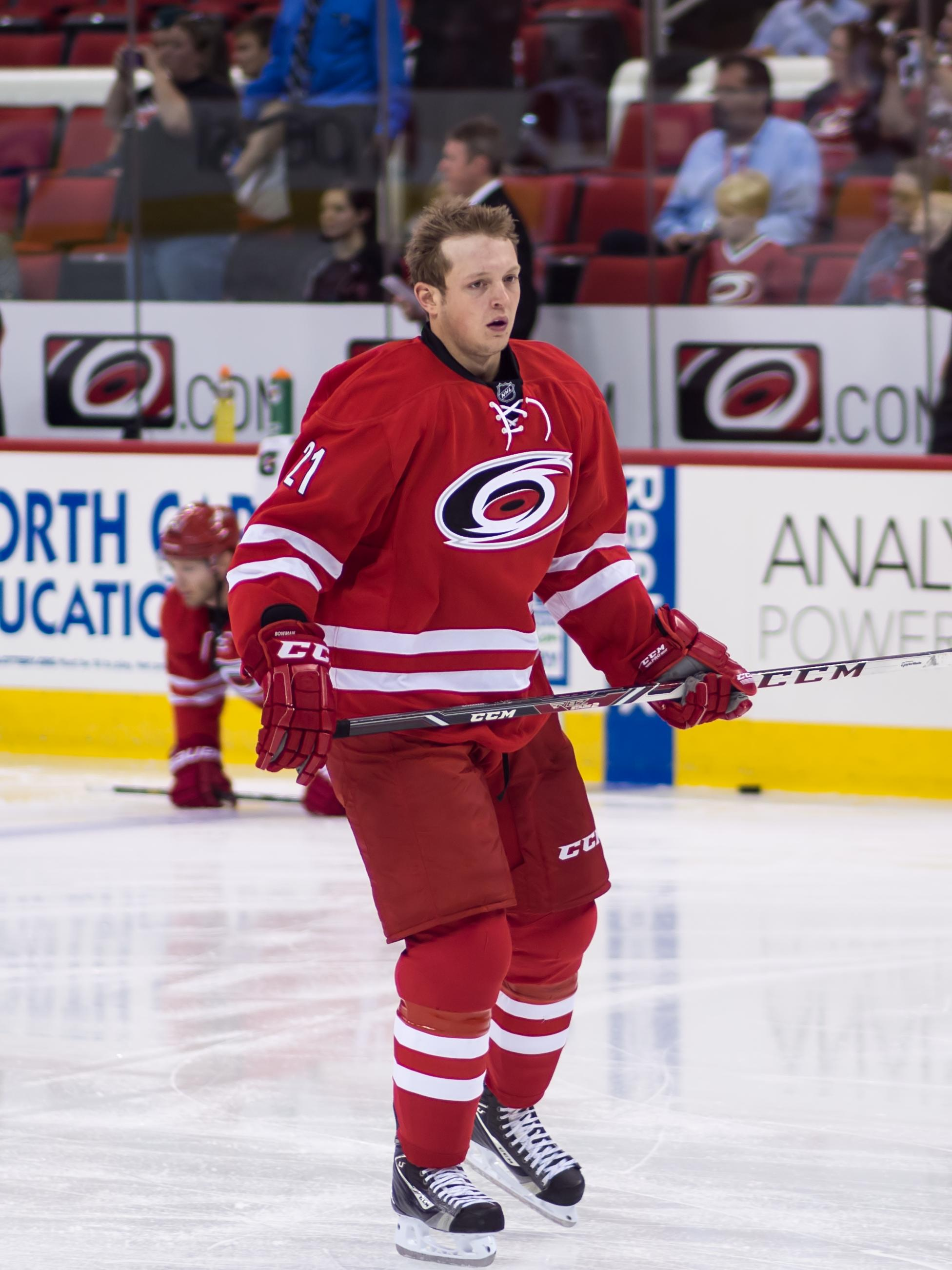
- Bowman with the Carolina Hurricanes in 2013
- Born: March 8, 1989 (age 37) Grand Rapids, Michigan, U.S.
- Height: 6 ft 0 in (183 cm)
- Weight: 190 lb (86 kg; 13 st 8 lb)
- Position: Center
- Shot: Left
- Played for: Carolina Hurricanes; Montreal Canadiens; Düsseldorfer EG
- National team: United States
- NHL draft: 72nd overall, 2007; Carolina Hurricanes
- Playing career: 2009–2018

Drayson Jack Bowman (born March 8, 1989) is an American former professional ice hockey player. A center, he previously played for the Montreal Canadiens and Carolina Hurricanes of the National Hockey League (NHL). Bowman was selected 72nd overall by the Hurricanes in the 2007 NHL entry draft.

Bowman spent four years at the major junior level with the Spokane Chiefs of the Western Hockey League (WHL). He won a Memorial Cup with the Chiefs in 2008 and was named a WHL West Second Team All-Star in 2009. He turned professional in 2009–10 and has spent the majority of his tenure with the Hurricanes in the team's farm system with the Albany River Rats and Charlotte Checkers of the American Hockey League (AHL). Internationally, Bowman has competed for the United States at the 2009 IIHF World U20 Championships.

== Early life ==
Bowman was born in Grand Rapids, Michigan, and was raised in Littleton, Colorado, after his family moved in the early 1990s. His father, Mark Bowman, owns a financial consulting company in Colorado. His younger brother, Collin, is also a hockey player and went on to also compete in the Western Hockey League with the Kelowna Rockets, Moose Jaw Warriors and Calgary Hitmen.

As a youth, Bowman played in the 2001 and 2002 Quebec International Pee-Wee Hockey Tournaments with the Colorado Junior Avalanche minor ice hockey team from Littleton. Bowman attended Deer Creek Middle School in Littleton. As a Colorado Avalanche fan, he has listed Joe Sakic as a player he looked up to.

In 2003, he and his family moved once more to Vancouver, British Columbia, to better his opportunities in hockey. He attended Vancouver Christian School while playing at the bantam level for the North Vancouver Winter Hawks.

== Playing career ==
=== Junior ===
Bowman was selected eighth overall by the Spokane Chiefs in the 2004 WHL Bantam Draft. He debuted in four games with the Chiefs in 2004–05, a season he spent primarily at the Junior B level (Note: Junior B represents the third-highest level of under-20 competition in Canada, after major junior and Junior A.) with the Kimberley Dynamiters of the Kootenay International Junior Hockey League (KIJHL). He recorded 29 goals and 59 points over 47 games with the Dynamiters to be named the Eddie Mountain Division's rookie of the year. Bowman joined the Chiefs full-time in 2005–06 and notched 17 goals and 34 points over 72 games (17th in WHL rookie scoring) to be named the team's rookie of the year. On a team basis, the Chiefs finished last in the Western Conference and failed to qualify for the playoffs.

Bowman entered the 2006–07 season listed as the ninth-best WHL prospect in the NHL Central Scouting Bureau (CSB)'s preliminary rankings of draft-eligible players. He was invited to play in the CHL Top Prospects Game and was subsequently listed in the CSB's midterm rankings as 44th among North American skaters. Bowman finished the season with an improved 24 goals and 43 points in 61 games. He played in his first WHL playoffs after the Chiefs ranked fourth in the U.S. Division. Playing in six post-season games, Bowman recorded a team-leading seven points (two goals and five assists). The Chiefs were eliminated in the first round by the Everett Silvertips. Entering the 2007 NHL entry draft in the off-season, he moved up to 36th among North American skaters in the NHL CSB's final rankings. Bowman was selected 72nd overall by the Carolina Hurricanes.

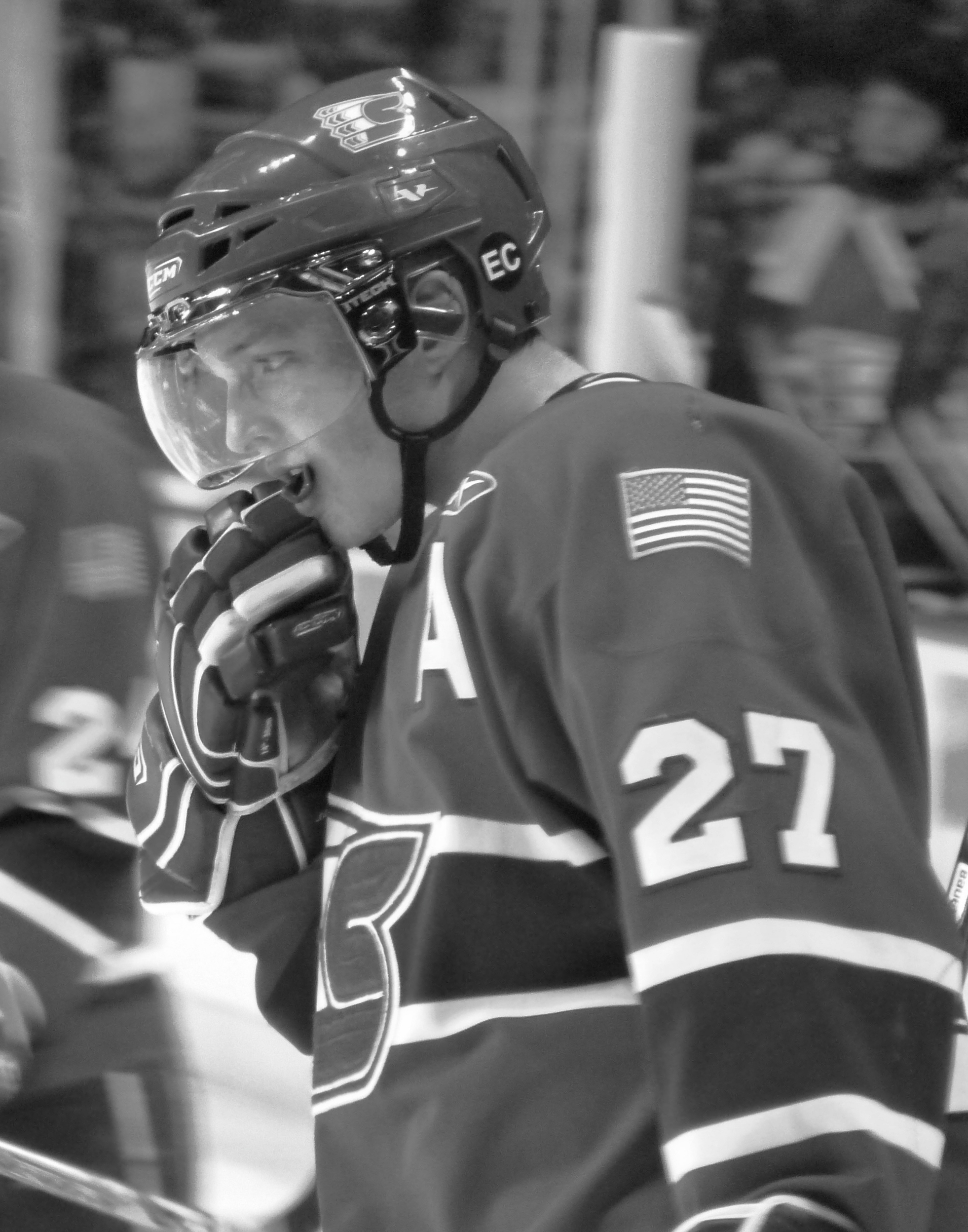
Bowman with the Spokane Chiefs during the 2009 WHL playoffs

Following his draft, Bowman participated in his first NHL training camp in September 2007 before being returned to Spokane to continue playing at the junior level. Playing in his third full WHL season, Bowman recorded a team-leading 82 points in 66 games. His 42 goals tied for fourth in the league. Bowman added a team-leading 20 points in 21 playoff games as the Chiefs captured the Ed Chynoweth Cup as WHL champions. The league title earned the Chiefs a berth in the 2008 Memorial Cup in Kitchener, Ontario. Bowman notched a hat trick in the opening game of the tournament, including the game-tying goal late in the third period of a 5–4 overtime win over the Belleville Bulls. He went on to score in all four games of the tournament, including game-winners against the Kitchener Rangers in the round-robin and final. The Chiefs went undefeated in the tournament to capture the Memorial Cup as Canadian major junior champions, beating the Kitchener Rangers 4–1 in the final. With a team-high eight points (third in tournament scoring behind Justin Azevedo and Matt Halischuk of the Rangers), including a tournament-leading six goals, in four games, Bowman was named to the Memorial Cup All-Star Team.

Following his Memorial Cup performance, the Hurricanes signed him to a three-year, US$2.06 million contract on July 31, 2008. Playing in his final season with the Chiefs in 2008–09, Drayson was named an alternate captain to Justin McCrae along with Seth Compton and Jared Spurgeon. He was named WHL and CHL Player of the Week after recording 12 points in 3 games for the week ending on February 1, 2009. The next month, he earned his second WHL and CHL Player of the Week distinctions with an eight-point effort in two games for the week ending on March 15, 2009. He finished the season with 47 goals, fourth in the league, and a junior career-high 83 points to lead his team in scoring for the second consecutive year. He was named to the WHL West Second All-Star Team along with goaltending teammate Dustin Tokarski. Bowman and the Chiefs were not able to defend their WHL or CHL titles as they were eliminated in seven games in the second round of the WHL playoffs by the Vancouver Giants. Spokane's elimination marked the end of Bowman's junior career. He left the Chiefs fifth on the team's all-time goals scored list with 136, 10 behind leader Pat Falloon. He had 114 assists for 250 points total over 269 games.

=== Professional ===
Upon the completion of Bowman's final WHL season, he was called up by the Hurricanes to travel and practice with the team during their 2009 playoff season. Carolina advanced to the Eastern Conference Finals, where they were eliminated by the Pittsburgh Penguins in four games. The following season, he was assigned to the Hurricanes' American Hockey League (AHL) affiliate, the Albany River Rats. He scored his first professional goal in his AHL debut with Albany on October 3, 2009, in a 6–3 loss to the Manchester Monarchs. Midway through the season, he was called up by the Hurricanes and made his NHL debut on January 16, 2010. Bowman recorded one shot on goal in 10 minutes of ice time in a 5–3 loss to the Atlanta Thrashers. After being sent back down to Albany, he received another call-up on March 24 in light of an injury to forward Tuomo Ruutu. During that call-up, he scored his first and second career NHL goals against goaltender Antero Niittymaki in the first period of an 8–5 win against the Tampa Bay Lightning on April 6. The milestone occurred in his seventh NHL game. Bowman completed the 2009–10 NHL season with two goals in nine games, while averaging 12 minutes of ice time. Hurricanes head coach Paul Maurice heralded him as a player with "a good set of hands and a really good hockey IQ" during his first stint in the NHL. As Carolina failed to qualify for the 2010 playoffs, ranking 11th in the East, (Note: The top eight teams in each conference qualified for the playoffs.) Bowman was reassigned to the River Rats for their 2010 playoff season. In the AHL, he finished the regular season with 32 points (17 goals and 15 assists) over 56 games, tying for 31st among league rookies and 10th among River Rats players. Bowman added nine points (three goals and six assists) over eight games in the playoffs (ranking fifth among rookies and tying for first in team scoring) as the River Rats were eliminated in the second round by the Hershey Bears.

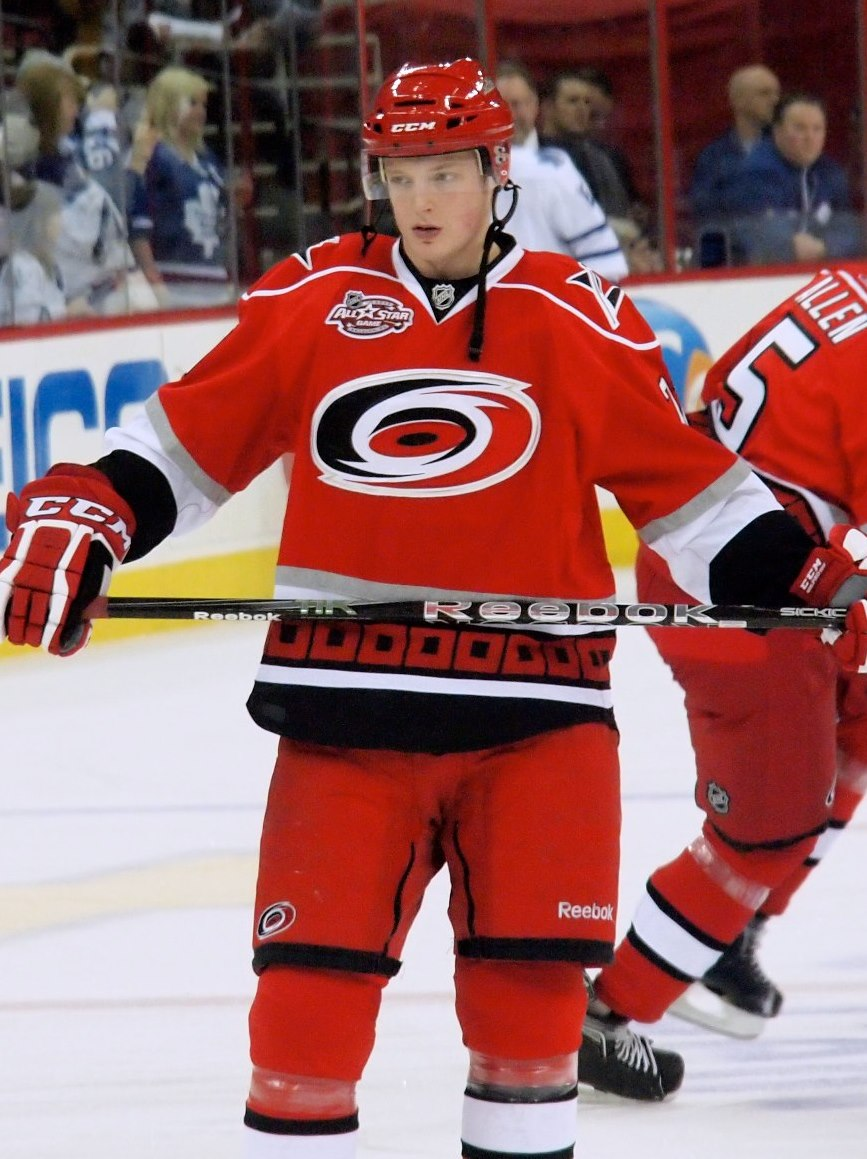
Bowman during a game on March 16, 2011

Bowman made the Hurricanes' roster out of training camp in 2010–11, but was returned to the AHL within a month. With the Hurricanes having changed their minor league affiliate, he joined a new team, the Charlotte Checkers. After recording 30 points (12 goals and 18 assists) over 51 games with the Checkers (10th in team scoring), he was recalled on March 10, 2011. Spending the remainder of the season with the Hurricanes, he finished 2010–11 with one assist over 23 games, while averaging 10 minutes of ice time. Carolina failed to qualify for the playoffs, coming within three points of the eighth and final seed in the Eastern Conference. With his NHL season over, the Hurricanes returned him to the AHL, where the Checkers had qualified for the 2011 Calder Cup Playoffs. Bowman contributed 8 points (2 goals and 6 assists) over 15 games as the Checkers were eliminated in the Conference Finals by the Binghamton Senators.

Bowman remained with Charlotte for the beginning of the 2011–12 season, failing to make the Hurricanes' roster out of training camp. In November 2011, he received a call-up to Carolina that lasted five days. The following month, he was recalled again and recorded a two-goal game against the Vancouver Canucks on December 15, 2011. The goals were his first in the NHL in over a year and eight months. After being reassigned, he received two more call ups before the end of the season. Bowman finished the season with 13 points over 37 NHL games in Carolina and 26 points over 42 AHL games in Charlotte. In the off-season, he was tendered a qualifying offer from the Hurricanes in order to retain his restricted free agent status.

A free agent following his first full season in the NHL with the Hurricanes in the 2013–14 season, Bowman agreed to attend the Montreal Canadiens training camp on a try-out contract on September 2, 2014. On October 2 Bowman agreed to a one-year two way contract with the Montreal Canadiens.

Bowman was not re-signed by the Canadiens and on October 12, 2015, without any NHL interest, Bowman signed a one-year deal with the Colorado Eagles of the ECHL. After registering 3 assists in 3 games with the Eagles to start the 2015–16 season, Bowman was loaned to former club, the Charlotte Checkers of the AHL on October 22, 2015. Bowman played a further 16 games with the Checkers before he left the club to pursue a European career in agreeing to a contract for the remainder of the season in Germany with Düsseldorfer EG of the DEL on December 21, 2015.

After two seasons with DEG, Bowman joined his brother Collin in returning to the Colorado Eagles of the ECHL as a free agent on September 14, 2017.

== International play ==
Bowman was named to the United States' under-20 team for the 2009 World Junior Championships in Ottawa, Ontario. He was joined on the national team by Spokane Chiefs teammates Tyler Johnson and Mitchell Wahl. Playing against Germany in the first game of preliminaries, he scored twice and was named player of the game. Over six games at the tournament, Bowman totalled three goals and one assist, tying for fifth in team point-scoring. After losing to Slovakia 5–3 in the quarterfinal, the United States beat the Czech Republic 3–2 in overtime of their placement game to rank fifth in the tournament.

== Career statistics ==
=== Regular season and playoffs ===
			Regular season					Playoffs
Season	Team	League	GP	G	A	Pts	PIM	GP	G	A	Pts	PIM
2004–05	Kimberley Dynamiters	KIJHL	47	29	30	59	108	—	—	—	—	—
2004–05	Spokane Chiefs	WHL	4	0	0	0	0	—	—	—	—	—
2005–06	Spokane Chiefs	WHL	72	17	17	34	51	—	—	—	—	—
2006–07	Spokane Chiefs	WHL	61	24	19	43	55	6	2	5	7	4
2007–08	Spokane Chiefs	WHL	66	42	40	82	62	21	11	9	20	8
2008–09	Spokane Chiefs	WHL	62	47	36	83	107	12	8	5	13	8
2009–10	Albany River Rats	AHL	56	17	15	32	29	8	3	6	9	12
2009–10	Carolina Hurricanes	NHL	9	2	0	2	4	—	—	—	—	—
2010–11	Charlotte Checkers	AHL	51	12	18	30	53	15	2	6	8	6
2010–11	Carolina Hurricanes	NHL	23	0	1	1	12	—	—	—	—	—
2011–12	Charlotte Checkers	AHL	42	13	13	26	45	—	—	—	—	—
2011–12	Carolina Hurricanes	NHL	37	6	7	13	4	—	—	—	—	—
2012–13	Charlotte Checkers	AHL	37	14	8	22	21	—	—	—	—	—
2012–13	Carolina Hurricanes	NHL	37	3	2	5	17	—	—	—	—	—
2013–14	Carolina Hurricanes	NHL	70	4	8	12	16	—	—	—	—	—
2014–15	Hamilton Bulldogs	AHL	62	14	19	33	33	—	—	—	—	—
2014–15	Montreal Canadiens	NHL	3	0	0	0	0	—	—	—	—	—
2015–16	Colorado Eagles	ECHL	3	0	3	3	2	—	—	—	—	—
2015–16	Charlotte Checkers	AHL	16	2	2	4	10	—	—	—	—	—
2015–16	Düsseldorfer EG	DEL	24	10	7	17	33	5	1	0	1	4
2016–17	Düsseldorfer EG	DEL	51	11	9	20	24	—	—	—	—	—
2017–18	Colorado Eagles	ECHL	65	20	35	55	66	20	5	6	11	14
NHL totals			179	15	18	33	53	—	—	—	—	—

=== International ===
Year	Team	Event	Result	GP	G	A	Pts	PIM
2009	United States	WJC	5th	6	3	1	4	6
Junior totals				6	3	1	4	6

== Awards and honors ==
Award	Year
KIJHL
Eddie Mountain Division rookie of the year	2005
WHL
Ed Chynoweth Cup (Spokane Chiefs)	2008
Memorial Cup (Spokane Chiefs)	2008
CHL Memorial Cup All-Star Team	2008
WHL and CHL player of the week	January 26 – February 1, 2009; March 9–15, 2009
WHL West Second All-Star Team	2008, 2009
ECHL
Kelly Cup (Colorado Eagles)	2018
International
World Junior Championships player of the game	vs. Germany, preliminaries; 2009
