= Jared Cowen =

Canadian ice hockey player (born 1991)

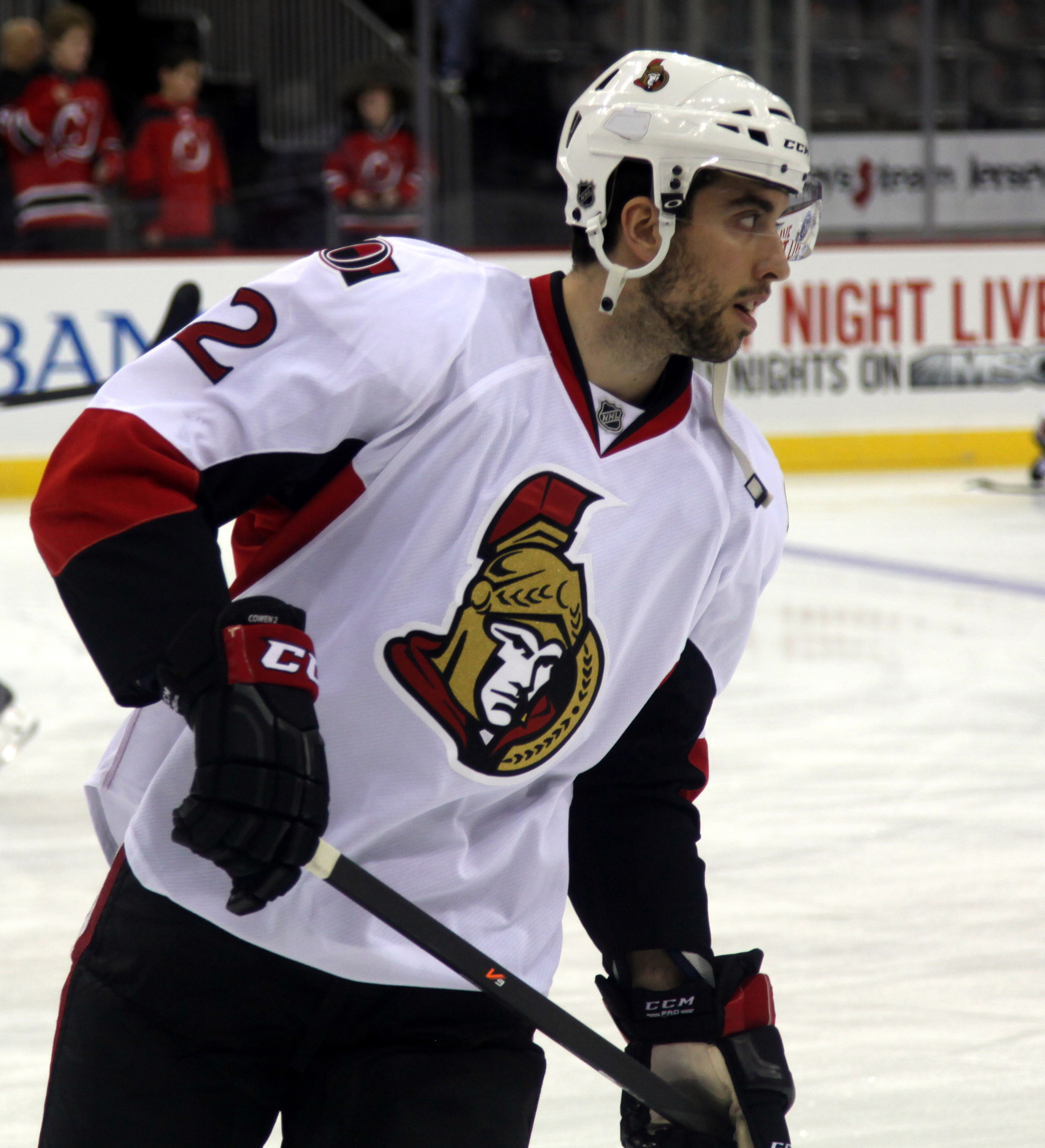
- Cowen with the Ottawa Senators in 2013
- Born: January 25, 1991 (age 35) Saskatoon, Saskatchewan, Canada
- Height: 6 ft 5 in (196 cm)
- Weight: 230 lb (104 kg; 16 st 6 lb)
- Position: Defence
- Shot: Left
- Played for: Ottawa Senators
- NHL draft: 9th overall, 2009; Ottawa Senators
- Playing career: 2010–2016

Jared Nelson Cowen (born January 25, 1991) is a Canadian former professional ice hockey player who played for the Ottawa Senators of the National Hockey League (NHL). Cowen was drafted in the first round, ninth overall, by the Senators in the 2009 NHL entry draft. Cowen was traded to the Toronto Maple Leafs in February 2016, but never played for the franchise and retired in 2017, after a pre-season tryout with the Colorado Avalanche.

== Playing career ==
=== Junior ===
Cowen was selected by the Spokane Chiefs with the first-overall pick in the Western Hockey League (WHL)'s 2006 Bantam Draft. He appeared in six regular-season games in the 2006–07 season and also six playoff games. In his first full season with the team, he played in 68 games, and had four goals, 14 assists and 18 points, to go along with 62 penalty minutes. The Chiefs won the Ed Chynoweth Cup that season as the league's champions. Cowen played in all 21 playoff games, scoring one goal and adding three assists. As the league's champions, the Chiefs subsequently earned a berth in the 2008 Memorial Cup, where they defeated the Kitchener Rangers by a score of 4-1. Cowen effectively clinched the Chiefs' championship by scoring into an empty net with 56 seconds to play. He was named the Chiefs rookie of the year, and the WHL Western Conference scholastic player of the year.

The 2008–09 season saw Cowen's numbers improve, as he registered 7 goals and 14 assists. However, his season was cut short due to a knee injury suffered in a game against the Chilliwack Bruins. He still managed to be ranked as the fourth-best skater in the final rankings for the 2009 NHL Draft by the International Scouting Service. He was chosen ninth overall by the Ottawa Senators. In his final year with the Chiefs, he was named a WHL Western Conference Second Team All-Star.

=== Professional ===
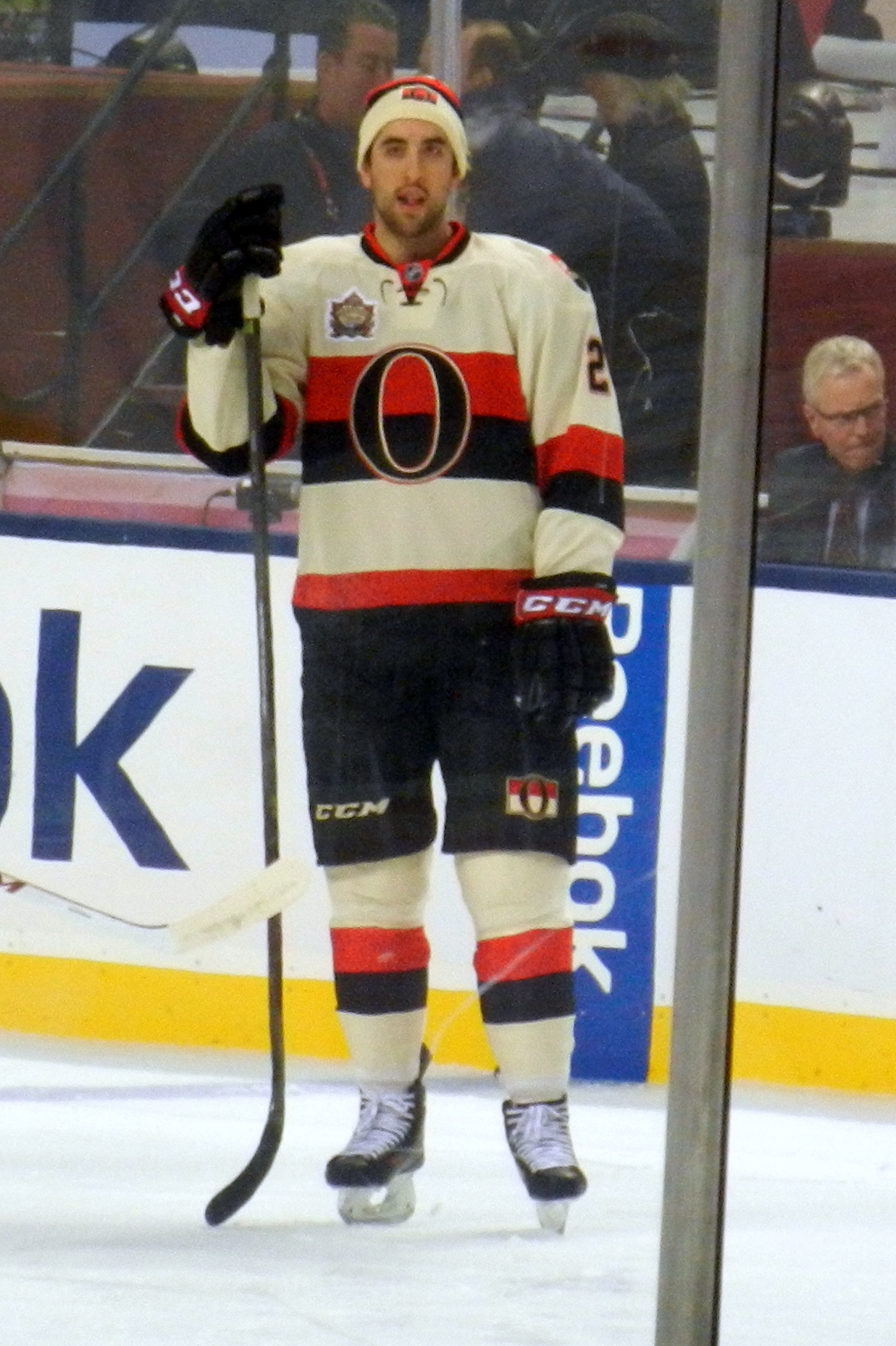
Cowen in 2014

Cowen signed a professional contract with the Senators on February 3, 2010. After Spokane was eliminated from the playoffs, Cowen received a call-up to the Senators. He made his NHL debut with the Senators on April 8, 2010, in Tampa against the Tampa Bay Lightning.

Compared by some scouts to Zdeno Chára and Derian Hatcher, Cowen was expected to challenge for a roster spot in Ottawa for the 2010–11 season. Cowen made it to the final cuts at the 2010 training camp before being returned to his junior team. He joined Ottawa's American Hockey League (AHL) affiliate, the Binghamton Senators after the Spokane Chiefs were ousted in the third round of the WHL playoffs. Binghamton at the time was in the second round of their own playoffs. Cowen quickly became a key component for his new team as they went on to win the 2011 Calder Cup championship.

In 2011–12, Cowen made the Ottawa roster out of training camp and played regularly, being paired with veteran defenceman Sergei Gonchar. He scored his first NHL goal on November 1, 2011, against Tim Thomas of the Boston Bruins. As the season progressed, Cowen emerged as one of Ottawa's top four defencemen.

During the 2012–13 NHL lockout, the Senators assigned Cowen to the Binghamton Senators, to give him the opportunity to play at a competitive level. He suffered what was expected to be a season-ending hip injury on October 6, 2012, in a game against the Albany Devils. Cowen underwent surgery on November 17, 2012, in New York to repair a torn labrum in his left hip. By March 27, 2013, Cowen was able to practice with the Senators, and he was finally able to return to the Ottawa lineup on April 16, 2013, much sooner than initial estimate of six-to-eight months. His return to the lineup was a memorable one, as he delivered a clean open-ice hit 13 minutes into the game which caused Carolina Hurricanes star forward Jeff Skinner to leave the game and not return. Cowen later fought both Chad LaRose and Kevin Westgarth. "I think it's the first two-fight game I've had since junior, but I like it," said Cowen of his first game back.

One day earlier, on April 15, 2013, Cowen was among a small group of Senators' players who had planned on attending the 2013 Boston Marathon. Cowen and the other players had originally intended to be at the marathon's finish line during the time at which bombs exploded, killing and injuring several spectators and runners. Scratches for that night's game against the Boston Bruins, the players changed their plans at the last minute and elected to return to their hotel for a nap instead. "We probably would have been in that exact same spot, within a block or so," said Cowen.

As Ottawa's 2013 training camp opened, Cowen remained unsigned as a restricted free agent. On September 14, 2013, the team announced that it had come to an agreement on a four-year contract with the defenceman with an average annual value of $3.1 million. That season Cowen struggled with consistency, finishing with six goals and 15 points in 68 games. He was suspended for two games on December 11, 2013 for an illegal hit to the head on Zemgus Girgensons of the Buffalo Sabres. In the 2014–15 season, the Senators were carrying eight defencemen on their daily roster and Cowen was scratched for four straight games and five games overall in October before seeing steady playing time. He finished the season playing in 54 games, but only five games after February 21, 2015 due to a three-game suspension for an illegal hit to head on Jussi Jokinen of the Florida Panthers and an illness. He was surpassed on the depth chart by Patrick Wiercioch.

In the 2015–16 season, Cowen struggled to solidify himself within the Ottawa lineup, occasionally seeing himself a healthy scratch. Cowen requested a trade and on February 9, 2016, Cowen was included in a blockbuster, nine-player trade with the Toronto Maple Leafs. Cowen, Colin Greening, Milan Michálek, Tobias Lindberg and Ottawa's 2017 second-round draft pick were sent to Toronto in exchange for Maple Leafs captain Dion Phaneuf, Matt Frattin, Casey Bailey, Ryan Rupert and Cody Donaghey. On February 26, 2016, Cowen was placed on waivers by the Maple Leafs and then assigned to their AHL affiliate, the Toronto Marlies the next day. Cowen was then sent home by Toronto to await a buyout and given the freedom to contact other teams about a new contract for the 2016–17 season; buying out Cowen's contract would provide the Leafs with a $650,000 salary cap credit for the 2016–17 season.

At the conclusion of the season, Cowen was placed on waivers with the intention of buying him out of his $3.1 million contract. After clearing waivers, Cowen filed a grievance against the Toronto Maple Leafs, claiming that since he was on the injury reserve, he could not be bought out of his contract. As a player younger than age 26, Cowen would have only been entitled to one-third of his remaining salary if bought out. On December 7, it was announced Cowen's grievance had been dismissed by an arbitrator, and that he would remain bought out.

After sitting out the entirety of the 2016–17 season recuperating from injury, Cowen now a free agent agreed to a professional tryout contract to attend the 2017 training camp of the Colorado Avalanche on August 30. After participating in camp, Cowen was released by Colorado with one pre-season game remaining on September 27, 2017.

== International play ==
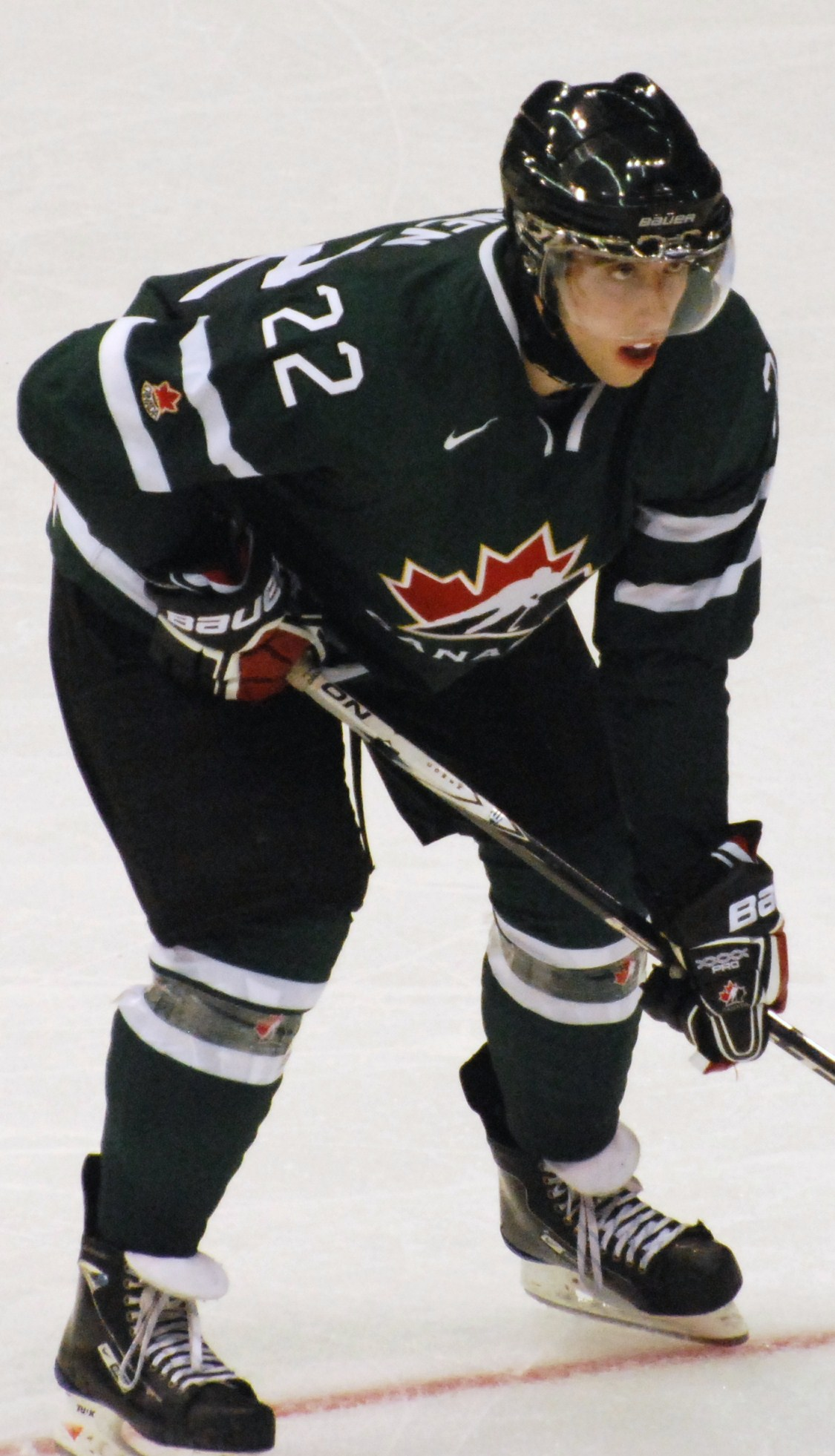
- Jared Cowen during pre-competition play at the 2010 World Junior Championships.

Medal record

Representing Canada

Ice hockey

World Juniors
| Silver medal – second place | 2011 USA | |
| Silver medal – second place | 2010 Canada | |

Ivan Hlinka Memorial Tournament
| Gold medal – first place | 2008 Czech Republic | |

World U17 Hockey Challenge
| Bronze medal – third place | 2008 Canada | |

Cowen helped Canada West win the bronze medal at the 2008 World U-17 Hockey Challenge. In the tournament, he had seven assists in six games en route to being named player of the game for Team West three times. Cowen was also an assistant captain on Canada's gold medal-winning team in the 2008 Ivan Hlinka Memorial Tournament as well as having been one of five underage players on Canada's gold medal-winning team in the 2008 IIHF World U18 Championships.

Cowen was invited to Team Canada's selection camp for the 2010 World Junior Championships held in Regina during December 2009. Cowen was selected to Team Canada for the event, which won the silver medal at the event but did not play much. On December 19, 2010, Cowen was named alternate captain for the 2011 Canadian junior national team to Ryan Ellis of the Windsor Spitfires, along with his fellow returnees, Brayden Schenn of the Brandon Wheat Kings and Calvin de Haan of the Oshawa Generals. He won another silver medal with that team.

== Career statistics ==
=== Regular season and playoffs ===
| | | | Regular season | | | | | Playoffs |
| Season | Team | League | GP | G | A | Pts | PIM | GP | G | A | Pts | PIM |
|---|---|---|---|---|---|---|---|---|---|---|---|---|
| 2005–06 | Saskatoon Contacts AAA | SMHL | 41 | 4 | 12 | 16 | 66 | 8 | 0 | 3 | 3 | 6 |
| 2006–07 | Saskatoon Contacts AAA | SMHL | 41 | 6 | 22 | 28 | 103 | 3 | 1 | 4 | 5 | 4 |
| 2006–07 | Spokane Chiefs | WHL | 6 | 0 | 2 | 2 | 2 | 6 | 0 | 1 | 1 | 6 |
| 2007–08 | Spokane Chiefs | WHL | 68 | 4 | 14 | 18 | 62 | 21 | 1 | 3 | 4 | 17 |
| 2008–09 | Spokane Chiefs | WHL | 48 | 7 | 14 | 21 | 45 | — | — | — | — | — |
| 2009–10 | Spokane Chiefs | WHL | 59 | 8 | 22 | 30 | 74 | 7 | 1 | 1 | 2 | 8 |
| 2009–10 | Ottawa Senators | NHL | 1 | 0 | 0 | 0 | 2 | — | — | — | — | — |
| 2010–11 | Spokane Chiefs | WHL | 58 | 18 | 30 | 48 | 91 | 9 | 0 | 9 | 9 | 4 |
| 2010–11 | Binghamton Senators | AHL | — | — | — | — | — | 10 | 0 | 4 | 4 | 0 |
| 2011–12 | Ottawa Senators | NHL | 82 | 5 | 12 | 17 | 56 | 7 | 0 | 1 | 1 | 4 |
| 2012–13 | Binghamton Senators | AHL | 3 | 0 | 3 | 3 | 2 | — | — | — | — | — |
| 2012–13 | Ottawa Senators | NHL | 7 | 1 | 0 | 1 | 10 | 10 | 0 | 3 | 3 | 21 |
| 2013–14 | Ottawa Senators | NHL | 68 | 6 | 9 | 15 | 45 | — | — | — | — | — |
| 2014–15 | Ottawa Senators | NHL | 54 | 3 | 6 | 9 | 45 | — | — | — | — | — |
| 2015–16 | Ottawa Senators | NHL | 37 | 0 | 4 | 4 | 16 | — | — | — | — | — |
| NHL totals | | | 249 | 15 | 31 | 46 | 174 | 17 | 0 | 4 | 4 | 25 |

=== International ===
| Year | Team | Event | Result | GP | G | A | Pts | PIM |
|---|---|---|---|---|---|---|---|---|
| 2008 | Canada Western | U17 | 3rd place, bronze medalist(s) | 6 | 0 | 7 | 7 | 4 |
| 2008 | Canada | IH18 | 1st place, gold medalist(s) | 4 | 0 | 0 | 0 | 6 |
| 2010 | Canada | WJC | 2nd place, silver medalist(s) | 6 | 0 | 1 | 1 | 2 |
| 2011 | Canada | WJC | 2nd place, silver medalist(s) | 7 | 1 | 0 | 1 | 4 |
| Junior totals | | | | 23 | 1 | 8 | 9 | 12 |

== Awards and honours ==
| Awards | Year |
|---|---|
CHL
| Memorial Cup (Spokane Chiefs) | 2008 |
AHL
| Calder Cup (Binghamton Senators) | 2011 |

Awards and achievements
| Preceded by Erik Karlsson | Ottawa Senators first-round draft pick 2009 | Succeeded by Mika Zibanejad |
