= Justin Falk =

Canadian ice hockey player (born 1988)

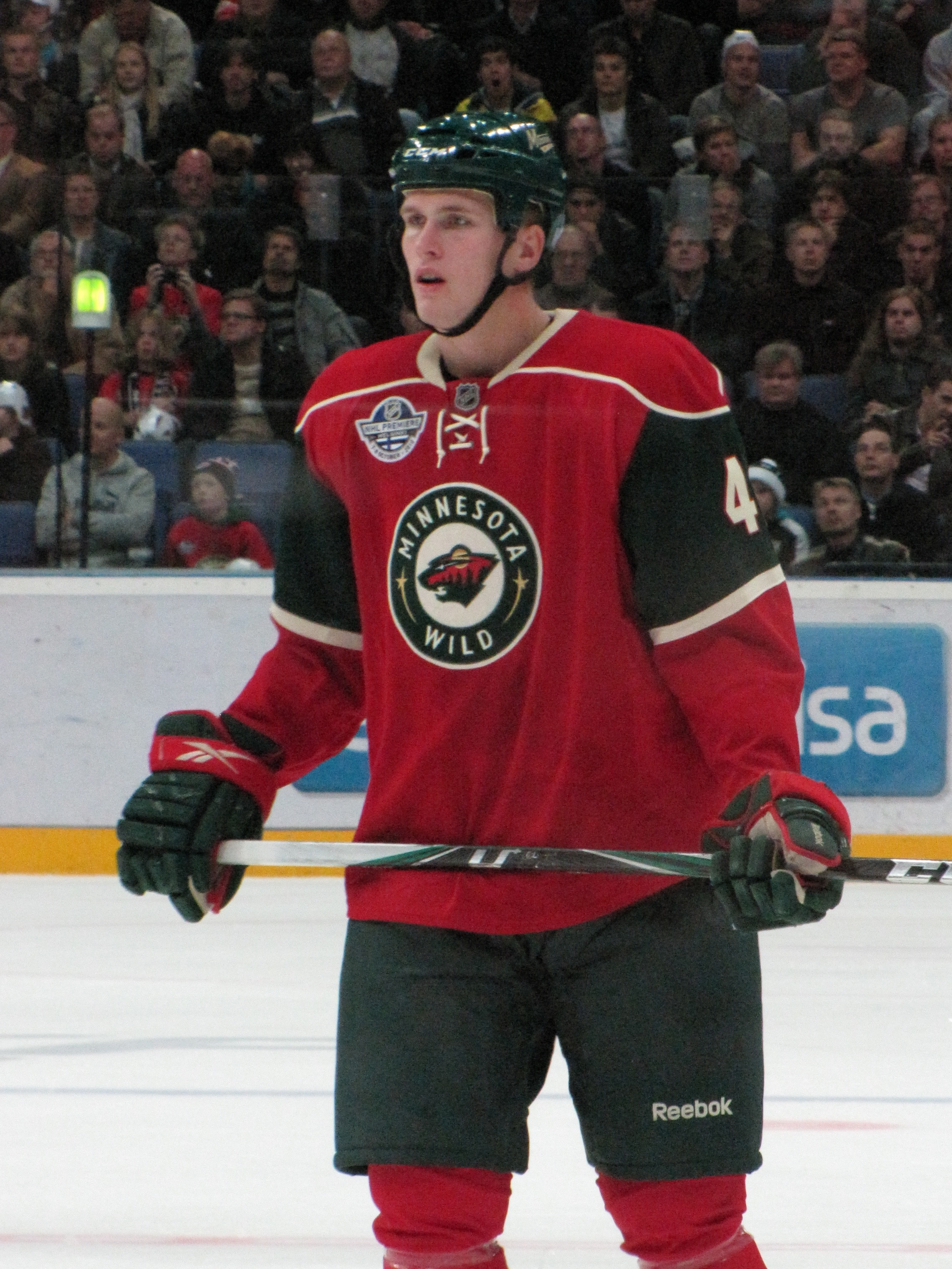
- Falk with the Minnesota Wild in 2010
- Born: October 11, 1988 (age 38) Snowflake, Manitoba, Canada
- Height: 6 ft 5 in (196 cm)
- Weight: 215 lb (98 kg; 15 st 5 lb)
- Position: Defence
- Shot: Left
- Played for: Minnesota Wild; New York Rangers; Columbus Blue Jackets; Buffalo Sabres; Ottawa Senators
- Coached for: Winkler Flyers
- NHL draft: 110th overall, 2007; Minnesota Wild
- Playing career: 2008–2019
- Coaching career: 2021–present

Justin Falk (born October 11, 1988) is a Canadian former professional ice hockey defenceman. He last played with the Belleville Senators in the American Hockey League (AHL). He made his National Hockey League debut in the 2009–10 season with the Minnesota Wild, and has since played for the New York Rangers, Columbus Blue Jackets, Buffalo Sabres, and Ottawa Senators. Justin is the current General Manager and Head Coach for the Winkler Flyers in the Manitoba Junior Hockey League.

== Playing career ==
Falk was a member of the Spokane Chiefs team that won both the Western Hockey League championship and the Memorial Cup in 2008, and was named to the tournament all-star team. He was drafted by the Minnesota Wild in the 2007 NHL entry draft, 110th overall.

Falk began his professional career in 2008 with the Houston Aeros. Falk made his NHL debut in the 2009–10 season, appearing in three games with the Wild. He scored his first NHL goal against J-S Giguere of the Colorado Avalanche on January 24, 2012.

On June 30, 2013, Falk was traded by the Wild to the New York Rangers in exchange for Benn Ferriero and a 2014 sixth round draft pick.

After spending one season with the Rangers, Falk returned to the Minnesota Wild as a free agent on August 1, 2014, signing a one-year, two-way contract. In the 2014–15 season, Falk was unable to secure a regular role on the Blueline and was assigned to AHL affiliate, the Iowa Wild for the majority of the season. On March 2, 2015, Falk was traded on request along with a fifth round pick in the 2015 NHL entry draft to the Columbus Blue Jackets for Jordan Leopold.

On July 1, 2016, Falk signed as a free agent to a one-year, two-way contract with the Buffalo Sabres. On February 6, 2017, the Sabres signed Falk to a one-year, $650,000 extension. In his tenure with the Sabres, Falk carved out his position on the roster as the club's depth defenceman in a rotating role. In the 2017–18 season, he played in 46 games for the cellar dwelling Sabres recording a goal and an assist while logging 16 minutes per night in ice time, his highest ATOI since 2011–12.

As a free agent from the Sabres, Falk went un-signed over the summer. With limited offers, he accepted a professional try-out contract to attend the Calgary Flames training camp, citing familiarity with former junior now Flames head coach Bill Peters. After attending camp and participating in pre-season, Falk was later released from his tryout without a contract from the Flames. With the 2018–19 season underway, Falk agreed to a professional try-out contract with the Colorado Eagles of the AHL, affiliate to the Colorado Avalanche, on October 29, 2018. On November 30, 2018, Falk signed a one-year, two-way contract with the Ottawa Senators. On January 21, 2019, Falk was placed on waivers by Ottawa Senators and assigned to their Belleville Senators affiliate.

== Career statistics ==
			Regular season					Playoffs
Season	Team	League	GP	G	A	Pts	PIM	GP	G	A	Pts	PIM
2004–05	Swan Valley Stampeders	MJHL	58	0	8	8	46	—	—	—	—	—
2004–05	Calgary Hitmen	WHL	4	0	0	0	2	5	0	0	0	0
2005–06	Calgary Hitmen	WHL	5	0	2	2	0	—	—	—	—	—
2005–06	Spokane Chiefs	WHL	48	0	8	8	35	—	—	—	—	—
2006–07	Spokane Chiefs	WHL	62	3	12	15	88	6	0	0	0	8
2007–08	Spokane Chiefs	WHL	72	4	22	26	98	21	1	4	5	12
2008–09	Houston Aeros	AHL	65	0	3	3	44	20	0	2	2	4
2009–10	Houston Aeros	AHL	69	3	6	9	87	—	—	—	—	—
2009–10	Minnesota Wild	NHL	3	0	0	0	0	—	—	—	—	—
2010–11	Minnesota Wild	NHL	22	0	3	3	6	—	—	—	—	—
2010–11	Houston Aeros	AHL	55	3	11	14	41	24	0	5	5	33
2011–12	Minnesota Wild	NHL	47	1	8	9	54	—	—	—	—	—
2012–13	Minnesota Wild	NHL	36	0	3	3	40	4	0	0	0	2
2013–14	New York Rangers	NHL	21	0	2	2	20	—	—	—	—	—
2014–15	Iowa Wild	AHL	39	1	6	7	34	—	—	—	—	—
2014–15	Minnesota Wild	NHL	13	0	0	0	7	—	—	—	—	—
2014–15	Columbus Blue Jackets	NHL	5	1	1	2	7	—	—	—	—	—
2015–16	Lake Erie Monsters	AHL	32	2	7	9	43	17	0	4	4	8
2015–16	Columbus Blue Jackets	NHL	24	0	4	4	17	—	—	—	—	—
2016–17	Rochester Americans	AHL	10	0	0	0	11	—	—	—	—	—
2016–17	Buffalo Sabres	NHL	52	0	8	8	29	—	—	—	—	—
2017–18	Buffalo Sabres	NHL	46	1	1	2	28	—	—	—	—	—
2018–19	Colorado Eagles	AHL	8	1	1	2	6	—	—	—	—	—
2018–19	Ottawa Senators	NHL	10	0	0	0	11	—	—	—	—	—
2018–19	Belleville Senators	AHL	18	1	4	5	10	—	—	—	—	—
NHL totals			279	3	30	33	219	4	0	0	0	2

== Awards and honors ==
Awards	Year
CHL
Memorial Cup	2008
Memorial Cup All-Star Team	2008
AHL
Calder Cup (Lake Erie Monsters)	2016
