= Dustin Tokarski =

Canadian ice hockey player (born 1989)

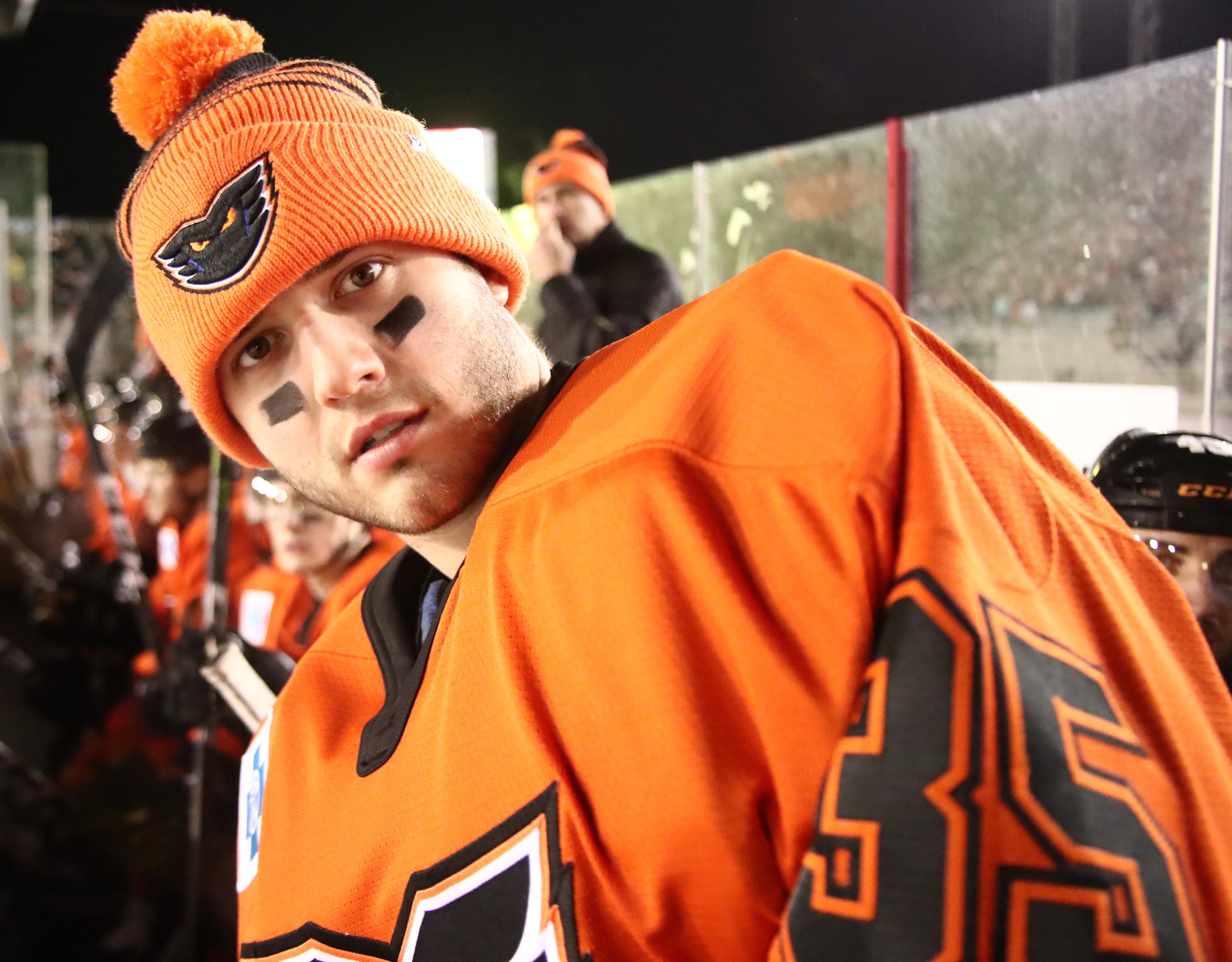
- Tokarski with the Lehigh Valley Phantoms in 2018
- Born: September 16, 1989 (age 37) Humboldt, Saskatchewan, Canada
- Height: 6 ft 0 in (183 cm)
- Weight: 205 lb (93 kg; 14 st 9 lb)
- Position: Goaltender
- Caught: Left
- Played for: Tampa Bay Lightning; Montreal Canadiens; Anaheim Ducks; Buffalo Sabres; Pittsburgh Penguins; Carolina Hurricanes; Löwen Frankfurt; Olimpija Ljubljana
- NHL draft: 122nd overall, 2008; Tampa Bay Lightning
- Playing career: 2009–2026

Dustin Michael Tokarski (born September 16, 1989) is a Canadian former professional ice hockey goaltender. He was born in Humboldt, Saskatchewan, but grew up in neighbouring Watson, which he considers his hometown.

Tokarski led the Spokane Chiefs of the Western Hockey League (WHL) to the 2008 Memorial Cup and was named the top goaltender and most valuable player of the tournament. Tokarski then backstopped Canada to their fifth consecutive gold medal at the 2009 World Junior Ice Hockey Championships. He was originally drafted by the Tampa Bay Lightning of the National Hockey League (NHL) in the fifth round, 122nd overall, at the 2008 NHL entry draft, and also played in the NHL for the Montreal Canadiens, Anaheim Ducks, Buffalo Sabres, Pittsburgh Penguins, and Carolina Hurricanes, as well as in Europe with Löwen Frankfurt of the Deutsche Eishockey Liga (DEL) and Olimpija Ljubljana of the ICE Hockey League (ICEHL). He won the American Hockey League's (AHL) Calder Cup twice: first with the Norfolk Admirals in 2012, and then with the Charlotte Checkers in 2019.

== Playing career ==
=== Minor/junior ===
Tokarski played midget for the Prince Albert Mintos and led the team to capture the Telus Cup, Canada's midget hockey championship in 2006. Tokarski had three shutouts and a 1.98 goals against average (GAA) for the Mintos. He was added to the protected list of the Western Hockey League (WHL)'s Spokane Chiefs in December. He played a combined 30 games in his first season with Spokane, posting a record of 13 wins, 11 losses and 2 overtime losses. Tokarski then took over as the Chiefs' starting goaltender in the 2007–08 season. He played every game for the Chiefs in the playoffs, leading them to the Ed Chynoweth Cup by conceding just 31 goals in 21 playoff games. The Chiefs' title earned them a berth in the 2008 Memorial Cup, Canada's national junior championship. With Tokarski in net, Spokane won all three games in the round robin to earn a berth in the championship game. Tokarski made 53 saves in the final as Spokane defeated the Ontario Hockey League (OHL)'s Kitchener Rangers to claim the Chiefs' second Memorial Cup championship in franchise history. His performance earned him the Hap Emms Memorial Trophy as the tournament's outstanding goaltender, and the Stafford Smythe Memorial Trophy as the most valuable player. Tokarski was selected by the Tampa Bay Lightning in the fifth round of the 2008 NHL entry draft.

=== Professional ===
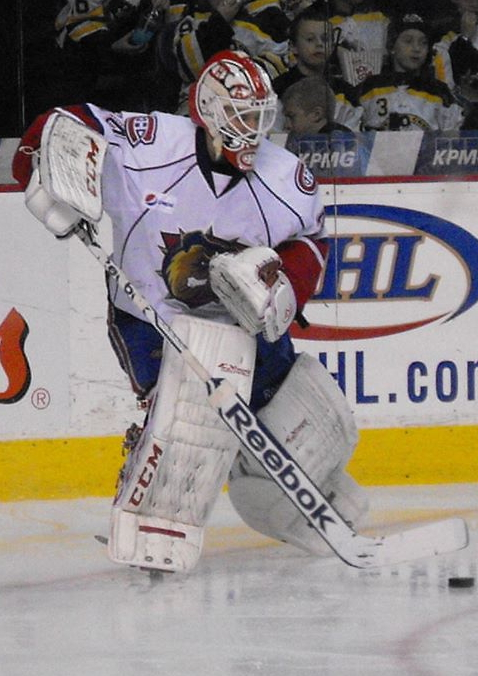
Tokarski with the Hamilton Bulldogs during the 2013–14 season.

==== Tampa Bay Lightning ====
Tokarski made the transition to professional hockey during the 2009–10 season, primarily playing for the Lightning's American Hockey League (AHL) affiliate, the Norfolk Admirals. In 55 games for the Admirals, Tokarski amassed a 27–25–3 record. He made his NHL debut on January 19, 2010, against the New York Rangers, replacing Antero Niittymäki in the third period after the latter had surrendered six goals.

Tokarski made his first NHL start on March 8, 2012, against the Washington Capitals. He had 29 saves on 32 shots and let three pucks by for a 3–2 Lightning overtime loss. He and the Admirals would eventually go on to win the Calder Cup as AHL champions.

==== Montreal Canadiens ====
On February 14, 2013, Tokarski was traded to the Montreal Canadiens in exchange for goaltender Cédrick Desjardins.

On March 5, 2014, Tokarski played his first game with Montreal, a 4–3 shootout victory over the Anaheim Ducks. On March 16, he recorded his first NHL shutout in a 2–0 win over the Buffalo Sabres, stopping all 29 of Buffalo's shots. On 19 May, it was announced Tokarski would be starting in place of Montreal's Carey Price due to a suspected sprained knee Price sustained against the New York Rangers. He started Game 2 of the Eastern Conference Finals against the Rangers but stumbled in his first playoff game with a 3–1 loss. He remained solid in the third period but the Canadiens had problems getting goal scoring. In Game 3, Tokarski made 35 saves on 37 shots to help the Canadiens win 3–2 in overtime, cutting the Rangers' series lead to 2–1. In Game 4, he played well and had a good chance to have a win but lost in overtime, 3–2. In Game 5, he then led the team to a 7–4 win, staving off elimination and reducing the Rangers' lead to 3–2 in the series. In Game 6, he stopped 31 shots on 32 shots to give his team a chance to win. Although the Canadiens lost the series 4–2 against New York, Tokarski's performance earned high praises.

Following the conclusion of the Canadiens' 2014–15 pre-season, goaltender Peter Budaj was traded to the Winnipeg Jets on October 6, 2014, effectively leaving Tokarski as Carey Price's backup for the 2014–15 season.

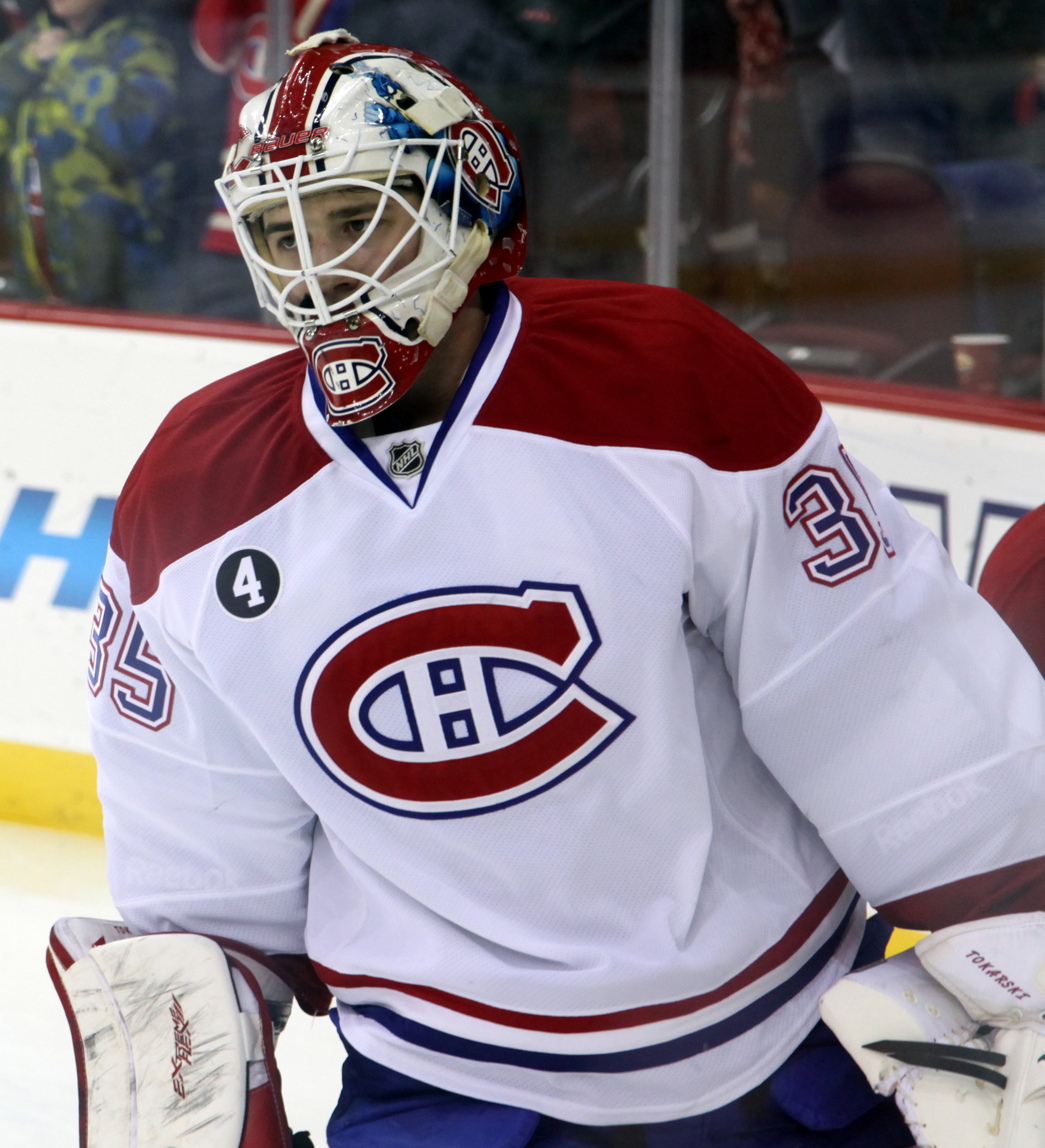
Tokarski with the Montreal Canadiens in 2015

At the beginning of the 2015–16 season, on October 5, 2015, Tokarski was placed on waivers, ending his tenure as backup goaltender for the NHL club. After fellow Canadiens' prospect Mike Condon had a strong showing in training camp, the team took him over Tokarski.

==== Anaheim Ducks ====
On January 7, 2016, Tokarski was traded to the Anaheim Ducks in exchange for Max Friberg. His lone appearance for the Ducks came on October 28, 2016, where he stopped all five shots faced in relief during a 4–0 loss to the Columbus Blue Jackets. Tokarski went 17–8–1 for the Ducks' AHL affiliate, the San Diego Gulls.

==== Philadelphia Flyers ====
On October 9, 2017, Tokarski was traded to the Philadelphia Flyers in exchange for future considerations.

==== New York Rangers ====
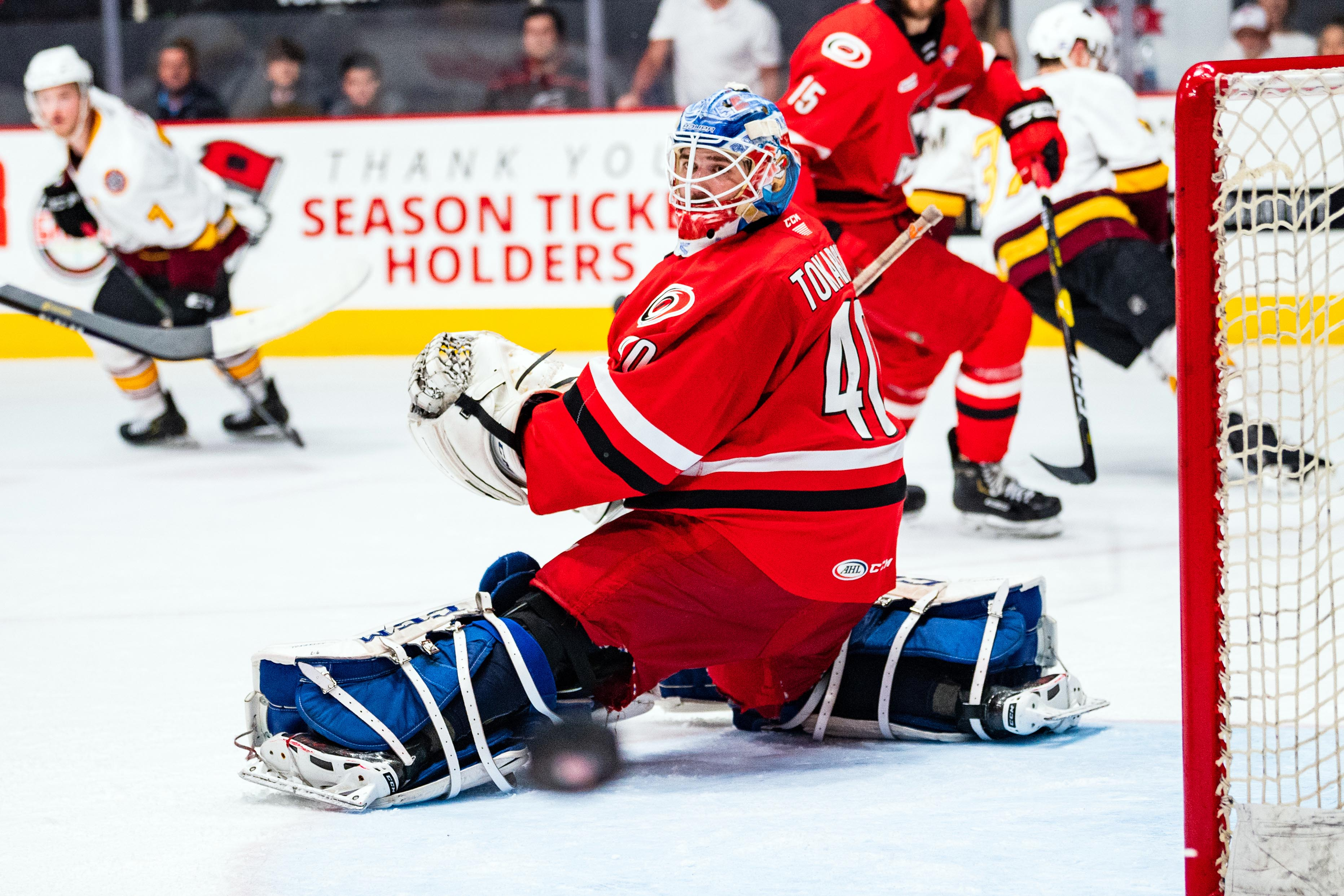
Tokarski during his run to the Calder Cup with the Checkers in 2019.

On August 20, 2018, as a free agent, Tokarski signed a one-year, two-way contract with the New York Rangers. He was assigned to the Rangers AHL affiliate, the Hartford Wolf Pack, to begin the 2018–19 season. Tokarski was rotated through starts during the season with the Wolf Pack, and made 21 appearances for 10 wins. He was recalled to the Rangers' roster on two occasions however did not play. On February 28, 2019, Tokarski was re-assigned by the Rangers to the Charlotte Checkers of the AHL. In a related move the Checkers NHL affiliate, the Carolina Hurricanes re-assigned prospect Josh Wesley from the Checkers to the Wolf Pack. In joining the Checkers, adding a veteran presence as the team's backup, Tokarski went undefeated in 7 regular season games and 5 playoff contests to help the Checkers claim the Calder Cup, his second AHL championship.

==== Wilkes-Barre/Scranton Penguins ====
On July 8, 2019, Tokarski signed a one-year contract with the Wilkes-Barre/Scranton Penguins. He followed Mike Vellucci, who was his head coach with the Checkers.

==== Buffalo Sabres ====
On November 4, 2020, Tokarski joined his sixth NHL organization, signing as a free agent to a two-year, two-way contract with the Buffalo Sabres. He made his first NHL appearance since the 2016–17 season on March 22, 2021 against the New York Rangers. On April 15, 2021, Tokarski earned his first NHL win since December 2015 in a 5–2 victory over the Washington Capitals.

==== Pittsburgh Penguins ====
On July 13, 2022, Tokarski rejoined the Pittsburgh Penguins organization, signing a one year, one-way deal with the Pittsburgh Penguins for an average annual value of $775,000.

==== Return to Buffalo ====
As a free agent at the conclusion of his contract with the Penguins, Tokarski opted to return to previous club, the Buffalo Sabres, in signing a one-year, two-way contract on July 1, 2023. In the 2023–24 season, Tokarski was assigned to the AHL for the duration of his contract with the Sabres, posting 11 wins through 24 appearances for the Rochester Americans.

==== Carolina Hurricanes ====
Leaving the Sabres at the conclusion of his contract, Tokarski as a free agent remained un-signed over the summer. Unable to land a contract following a tryout within the Ottawa Senators organization, Tokarski began the 2024–25 season without a club. On November 2, 2024, Tokarski was signed to a PTO with the Chicago Wolves of the AHL. Following 5 appearances with the Wolves, Tokarski was signed to a one-year, two-way contract to add depth to NHL affiliate the Carolina Hurricanes on December 2, 2024. Tokarski made his debut for the Hurricanes on December 15, 2024 versus the Columbus Blue Jackets in Raleigh, earning a win after making 27 saves against 28 shots.

==== Europe and retirement ====
As a free agent leading into the 2025–26 season, Tokarski was belatedly signed to a PTO with the Detroit Red Wings AHL affiliate, the Grand Rapids Griffins on November 13, 2025. He collected a win in his only start with the Griffins before he was released from his PTO. Opting to further his career in Europe, Tokarski was signed for the remainder of the season in joining German top flight club, Löwen Frankfurt of the Deutsche Eishockey Liga, on December 19, 2025. Following his time with Frankfurt, Tokarski signed with HK Olimpija Ljubljana of the ICE Hockey League in time for their playoffs, following an injury to starting goaltender Lukáš Horák.

On September 4, 2026, Tokarski re-joined his final NHL team, the Carolina Hurricanes, as a goaltending scout, ending his playing career.

== International play ==
Medal record

Representing Canada

ice hockey

World Junior Championship
Gold medal – first place	2009 Canada	

Tokarski was named to Canada's roster for the 2009 World Junior Ice Hockey Championships. He struggled during the tournament, entering the final as the eighth-best tournament goaltender statistically, though he led Canada to thrilling 7–4 and 6–5 wins over the United States and Russia, respectively. Tokarski played his best game in the final, posting 39 saves on 40 shots as Canada defeated Sweden 5–1 to win its fifth consecutive gold medal.

== Career statistics ==
=== Regular season and playoffs ===
			Regular season									Playoffs
Season	Team	League	GP	W	L	OTL	MIN	GA	SO	GAA	SV%	GP	W	L	MIN	GA	SO	GAA	SV%
2006–07	Spokane Chiefs	WHL	30	13	11	2	1674	78	2	2.80	.903	6	2	4	364	17	0	2.80	.901
2007–08	Spokane Chiefs	WHL	45	30	10	3	2543	87	6	2.05	.922	21	16	5	1352	31	3	1.38	.944
2008–09	Spokane Chiefs	WHL	54	34	18	2	3264	107	7	1.97	.937	12	7	5	812	23	1	1.70	.947
2009–10	Norfolk Admirals	AHL	55	27	25	3	3319	139	4	2.51	.915	—	—	—	—	—	—	—	—
2009–10	Tampa Bay Lightning	NHL	2	0	0	0	44	3	0	4.06	.813	—	—	—	—	—	—	—	—
2010–11	Norfolk Admirals	AHL	46	21	20	4	2691	119	2	2.65	.901	6	2	4	355	13	1	2.19	.924
2011–12	Norfolk Admirals	AHL	45	32	11	0	2583	96	5	2.23	.913	14	12	2	866	21	3	1.46	.944
2011–12	Tampa Bay Lightning	NHL	5	1	3	1	244	14	0	3.45	.879	—	—	—	—	—	—	—	—
2012–13	Syracuse Crunch	AHL	33	18	8	4	1881	77	3	2.46	.900	—	—	—	—	—	—	—	—
2012–13	Hamilton Bulldogs	AHL	15	6	8	0	836	31	3	2.22	.927	—	—	—	—	—	—	—	—
2013–14	Hamilton Bulldogs	AHL	41	20	16	3	2375	94	1	2.38	.919	—	—	—	—	—	—	—	—
2013–14	Montreal Canadiens	NHL	3	2	0	0	163	5	1	1.84	.946	5	2	3	300	13	0	2.60	.916
2014–15	Montreal Canadiens	NHL	17	6	6	4	1005	46	0	2.75	.910	—	—	—	—	—	—	—	—
2014–15	Hamilton Bulldogs	AHL	2	1	1	0	119	5	0	2.52	.919	—	—	—	—	—	—	—	—
2015–16	St. John's IceCaps	AHL	10	3	3	4	613	29	0	2.84	.909	—	—	—	—	—	—	—	—
2015–16	Montreal Canadiens	NHL	6	1	3	0	226	12	0	3.18	.878	—	—	—	—	—	—	—	—
2015–16	San Diego Gulls	AHL	2	1	1	0	102	4	0	2.35	.920	—	—	—	—	—	—	—	—
2016–17	San Diego Gulls	AHL	27	17	8	1	1578	77	1	2.93	.898	2	0	0	30	0	0	0.00	1.000
2016–17	Anaheim Ducks	NHL	1	0	0	0	10	0	0	0.00	1.000	—	—	—	—	—	—	—	—
2017–18	Lehigh Valley Phantoms	AHL	39	20	8	2	2127	94	5	2.65	.915	3	1	1	130	9	0	4.17	.859
2018–19	Hartford Wolf Pack	AHL	21	10	6	2	1141	59	1	3.10	.901	—	—	—	—	—	—	—	—
2018–19	Charlotte Checkers	AHL	7	7	0	0	419	8	1	1.14	.956	5	5	0	275	8	0	1.74	.935
2019–20	Wilkes-Barre/Scranton Penguins	AHL	18	9	5	2	915	30	1	1.97	.924	—	—	—	—	—	—	—	—
2020–21	Rochester Americans	AHL	2	1	1	0	120	5	0	2.51	.932	—	—	—	—	—	—	—	—
2020–21	Buffalo Sabres	NHL	13	2	8	2	730	43	0	3.54	.904	—	—	—	—	—	—	—	—
2021–22	Buffalo Sabres	NHL	29	10	12	5	1672	91	1	3.27	.899	—	—	—	—	—	—	—	—
2022–23	Wilkes-Barre/Scranton Penguins	AHL	36	12	16	7	2118	95	1	2.69	.910	—	—	—	—	—	—	—	—
2022–23	Pittsburgh Penguins	NHL	4	1	2	0	210	12	0	3.44	.897	—	—	—	—	—	—	—	—
2023–24	Rochester Americans	AHL	24	11	9	3	1408	78	0	3.32	.890	—	—	—	—	—	—	—	—
2024–25	Chicago Wolves	AHL	21	11	8	1	1181	56	2	2.84	.897	—	—	—	—	—	—	—	—
2024–25	Carolina Hurricanes	NHL	6	4	2	0	358	13	1	2.18	.902	—	—	—	—	—	—	—	—
2025–26	Grand Rapids Griffins	AHL	2	1	0	0	63	2	0	1.92	.929	—	—	—	—	—	—	—	—
2025–26	Löwen Frankfurt	DEL	5	0	5	0	274	25	0	5.48	.834	—	—	—	—	—	—	—	—
2025–26	Olimpija Ljubljana	ICEHL	1	0	1	0	60	3	0	3.00	.900	10	5	5	618	21	1	2.04	.934
NHL totals			86	27	36	12	4,661	239	3	3.08	.902	5	2	3	300	13	0	2.60	.916
DEL totals			5	0	5	0	274	25	0	5.48	.834	—	—	—	—	—	—	—	—
ICEHL totals			1	0	1	0	60	3	0	3.00	.900	10	5	5	618	21	1	2.04	.934

=== International ===
Year	Team	Event	Result	GP	W	L	T	MIN	GA	SO	GAA	SV%
2009	Canada	WJC	1st place, gold medalist(s)	4	4	0	0	249	11	0	2.65	.906
Junior totals				4	4	0	0	249	11	0	2.65	.906

== Awards and honours ==
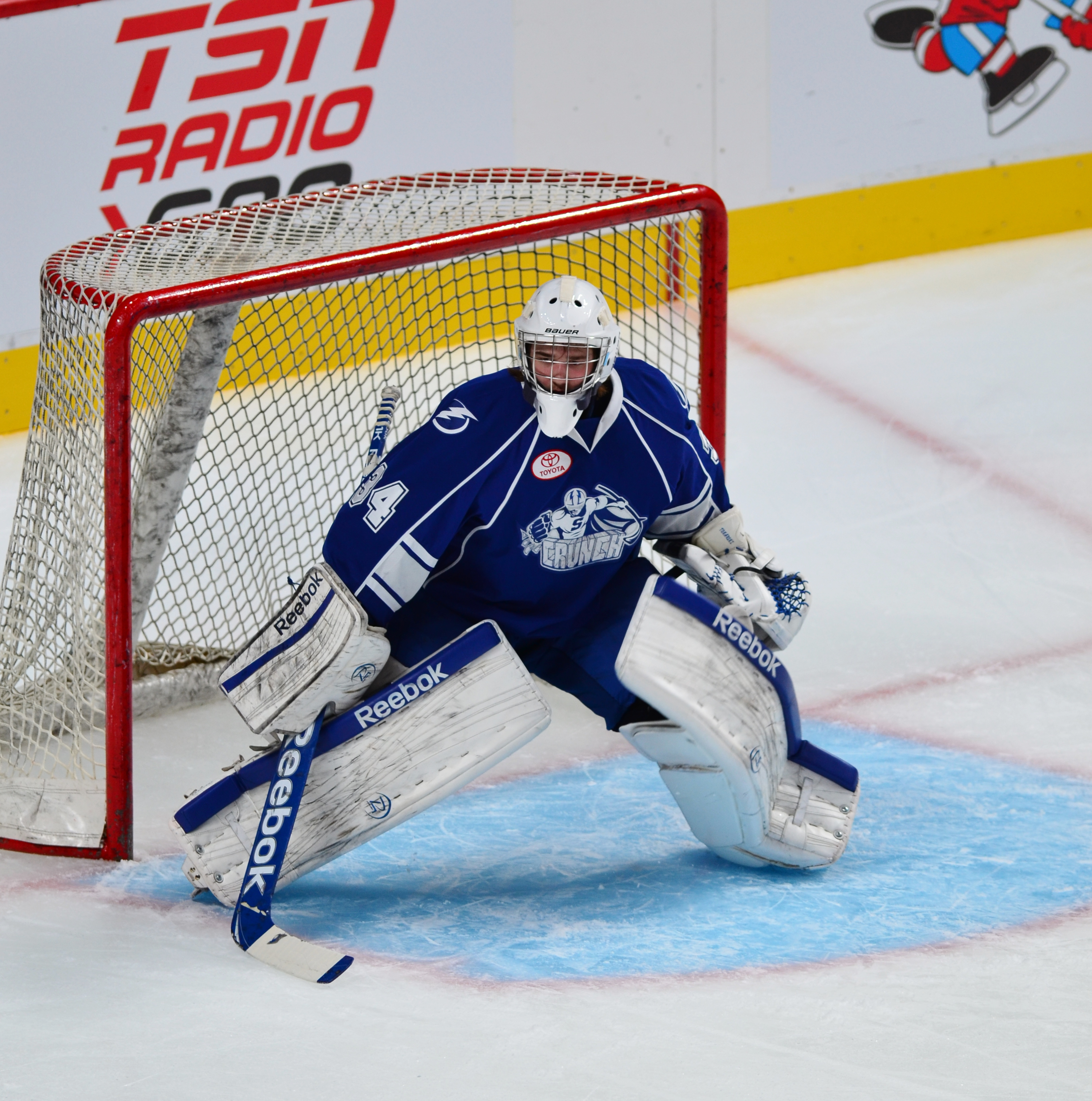
Tokarski with the Syracuse Crunch in 2012

Award	Year
Midget
Telus Cup Championship	2006
CHL
Memorial Cup (Spokane Chiefs)	2008
Memorial Cup All-Star Team	2008
Stafford Smythe Memorial Trophy	2008
Hap Emms Memorial Trophy	2008
WHL West Second All-Star Team	2009
AHL
Calder Cup (Norfolk Admirals)	2012
All-Star Game	2014
Calder Cup (Charlotte Checkers)	2019
