= 2008 Memorial Cup =

Canadian junior men's ice hockey championship

2008 Mastercard Memorial Cup

Tournament details
- Venue(s): Kitchener Memorial Auditorium; Kitchener, Ontario
- Dates: May 16–25, 2008
- Teams: 4
- Host team: Kitchener Rangers (OHL)
- TV partners: Rogers Sportsnet (Canada); NHL Network (USA)

Final positions
- Champions: Spokane Chiefs (WHL) (2nd title)
- Runners-up: Kitchener Rangers (OHL)

Tournament statistics
- Games played: 8
- Attendance: 53,545 (6,693 per game)
- Scoring leader: Justin Azevedo (Rangers) (11 points)

Awards
- MVP: Dustin Tokarski (Chiefs)

The Memorial Cup trophy

The 2008 Memorial Cup was played in May 2008 in Kitchener, Ontario at the Memorial Auditorium. It was the 90th annual Memorial Cup competition and determined the major junior ice hockey champion of the Canadian Hockey League (CHL). Kitchener defeated competing bids from Oshawa, Saginaw, London, Sarnia and Kingston to host the Memorial Cup, with the official announcement being made on May 10, 2007. The tournament was competed between the WHL champion Spokane Chiefs, the QMJHL champion Gatineau Olympiques, the Kitchener Rangers as host of the tournament and OHL champions, and the OHL representative Belleville Bulls, who earned their place by reaching the OHL finals against Kitchener. The Memorial Cup tournament is a four team tournament with a round-robin format.

The tournament began on May 16, 2008, with a round-robin game between Gatineau and Kitchener and ended on May 25, 2008, with the Spokane Chiefs defeating the Kitchener Rangers 4–1 in the championship game to win the Memorial Cup. A memorable moment of the tournament occurred immediately following the championship game. As Spokane Chiefs captain Chris Bruton was about to hand the trophy to teammate Trevor Glass, the cup detached from the base and fell to the ice. This was not the original Memorial Cup, which resides at the Hockey Hall of Fame, but a replica.

== Round-robin standings ==
Pos	Team	Pld	W	L	GF	GA	GD	
1	Spokane Chiefs (WHL Champion)	3	3	0	10	6	+4	Advanced directly to the championship game
2	Belleville Bulls (OHL Finalist)	3	2	1	14	11	+3	Advanced to the semifinal game
3	Kitchener Rangers (Host/OHL Champion)	3	1	2	10	11	−1	Advanced to the semifinal game
4	Gatineau Olympiques (QMJHL Champion)	3	0	3	9	15	−6	

== Rosters ==
Kitchener Rangers (host)	Belleville Bulls (OHL)
Goaltenders: 30 - Josh Unice; 31 - Matt Smith; Defencemen: 3 - Frank Perna; 4 - Alex Dzielski; 5 - Yannick Weber; 7 - Ben Shutron; 8 - Dan Kelly; 9 - Myles Barberi; 20 - Matt Pepe; 21 - Robert Bortuzzo; Forwards: 10 - Michael Catenacci; 11 - Nick Spaling; 12 - Scott Tregunna; 13 - Scott Timmins; 14 - Mike Duco; 15 - Justin Azevedo; 16 - Josh Schram; 17 - Mike Mascioli; 18 - Matthew Halischuk; 19 - Nazem Kadri; 23 - Brandon Mashinter; 24 - Spencer Anderson; 25 - Jason Akeson; 26 - T. J. Battani; 29 - Alexei Dostoynov; 89 - Mikkel Boedker; Head coach: Peter DeBoer	Goaltenders: 31 - Parker Van Buskirk; 32 - Mike Murphy; Defencemen: 2 - Chris Mifflen; 3 - Rob Stellick; 4 - Geoff Killing; 5 - Nigel Williams; 6 - P. K. Subban; 8 - Marc Cantin; 9 - Shawn Lalonde; 24 - Nick Pageau; Forwards: 7 - Cory Tanaka; 10 - Stephen Johnston; 11 - Tyler Randell; 12 - Shawn Matthias; 13 - Jan Mursak; 14 - Luke Judson; 16 - Adam Perry; 17 - Matt Beleskey; 18 - Michael Neal; 19 - Keaton Turkiewicz; 22 - Andy Bathgate; 23 - Bryan Cameron; 25 - Eric Tangradi; 26 - Andrew Self; 27 - Matthew Tipoff; 28 - Stephen Blunden; Head coach: George Burnett
Gatineau Olympiques (QMJHL)	Spokane Chiefs (WHL)
Goaltenders: 30 - Ryan Mior; 35 - Maxime Clermont; Defencemen: 2 - Maxime Mallette; 5 - Jonathan Carrier; 6 - Steven Delisle; 7 - Hugo Laporte; 9 - Patrik Prokop; 12 - Julien Machabee; 14 - Hubert Labrie; 55 - Joey Ryan; Forwards: 11 - Jean-Phillippe Chabot; 17 - Michael Stinzani; 18 - Alexandre Touchette; 19 - Nicholas Valliere Mayer; 20 - Paul Byron; 21 - Alexandre Quesnel; 22 - Francis Desrosiers; 23 - Gerrit Fauser; 24 - Darryl Smith; 25 - Nicolas Boyer; 26 - Matthew Pistilli; 27 - Travis Stacey; 28 - Claude Giroux; 44 - Takuma Kawai; Head coach: Benoit Groulx	Goaltenders: 31 - Kevin Armstrong; 34 - Dustin Tokarski; Defencemen: 2 - Jared Cowen; 3 - Trevor Glass; 4 - Mike Reddington; 5 - Jace Coyle; 6 - Brett Bartman; 15 - Justin Falk; 18 - Jared Spurgeon; 22 - Stefan Ulmer; Forwards: 7 - Ryan Letts; 9 - Tyler Johnson; 10 - Blake Gal; 12 - Chris Bruton; 14 - Mitch Wahl; 16 - Dustin Donaghy; 17 - Justin McCrae; 20 - David Rutherford; 21 - Ondrej Roman; 23 - Judd Blackwater; 24 - Curtis Kelner; 25 - Levko Koper; 26 - Seth Compton; 27 - Drayson Bowman; Head coach: Bill Peters

== Schedule ==
All times local (UTC -5)

=== Round Robin ===
May 16	Gatineau Olympiques	5–6	OT	Kitchener Rangers	Kitchener Memorial Auditorium, Kitchener	Recap
Michael Stinziani 1 - 14:13; Paul Byron 1 - 16:40		First period		6:17 - Jason Akeson 1; 7:49 - Nick Spaling 1; 11:57 - Matthew Halischuk 1
Darryl Smith 1 - pp - 12:57		Second period		2:30 - pp - Mikkel Boedker 1; 9:29 - Matthew Halischuk 2
Nicholas Valliere Mayer 1 - pp - 3:59; Alexandre Quesnel 1 - 9:05		Third period		No scoring
No scoring		First overtime period		6:59 - pp - Justin Azevedo 1
Ryan Mior 47 saves / 53 shots		Goalie stats		Josh Unice 23 saves / 28 shots

May 17	Belleville Bulls	4–5	OT	Spokane Chiefs	Kitchener Memorial Auditorium, Kitchener	Recap
No scoring		First period		9:52 - Drayson Bowman 1; 12:12 - Mitch Wahl 1; 17:05 - Drayson Bowman 2
Bryan Cameron 1 - 2:27; Shawn Matthias 1 - pp - 13:56; Cory Tanaka 1 - 19:04		Second period		No scoring
Cory Tanaka 2 - 7:35		Third period		17:04 - Drayson Bowman 3
No scoring		First overtime period		4:46 - Levko Koper 1
Mike Murphy 49 saves / 54 shots		Goalie stats		Dustin Tokarski 28 saves / 32 shots

May 18	Kitchener Rangers	1–2	Spokane Chiefs	Kitchener Memorial Auditorium, Kitchener	Recap
Matthew Halischuk 3 - sh - 4:21		First period	16:45 - Justin Falk 1
No scoring		Second period	5:24 - Drayson Bowman 4
No scoring		Third period	No scoring
Josh Unice 27 saves / 29 shots		Goalie stats	Dustin Tokarski 36 saves / 37 shots

May 19	Belleville Bulls	6–3	Gatineau Olympiques	Kitchener Memorial Auditorium, Kitchener	Recap
Jan Mursak 1 - 8:13; Shawn Matthias 2 - sh - 10:26		First period	13:46 - Hugo Laporte 1; 18:05 - Michael Stinziani 2
Cory Tanaka 3 - sh - 1:49		Second period	9:35 - Claude Giroux 1
Shawn Matthias 3 - 13:04; Keaton Turkiewicz 1 - 15:35; Nigel Williams 1 - pp - 17:43		Third period	No scoring
Mike Murphy 30 saves / 33 shots		Goalie stats	Ryan Mior 41 saves / 47 shots

May 20	Spokane Chiefs	3–1	Gatineau Olympiques	Kitchener Memorial Auditorium, Kitchener	Recap
No scoring		First period	15:57 - pp - Alexandre Quesnel 2
Drayson Bowman 5 - pp - 5:20; Mitch Wahl 2 - 16:09		Second period	No scoring
Levko Koper 2 - en - 19:25		Third period	No scoring
Dustin Tokarski 26 saves / 27 shots		Goalie stats	Ryan Mior 40 saves / 42 shots

May 21	Kitchener Rangers	3–4	OT	Belleville Bulls	Kitchener Memorial Auditorium, Kitchener	Recap
Scott Tregunna 1 - 8:07; Mikkel Boedker 2 - pp - 11:38; Yannick Weber 1 - 12:39		First period		No scoring
No scoring		Second period		7:28 - sh - Shawn Matthias 4; 13:15 - pp - Cory Tanaka 4
No scoring		Third period		0:20 - pp - P. K. Subban 1
No scoring		First overtime period		8:55 - Keaton Turkiewicz 2
Josh Unice 25 saves / 29 shots		Goalie stats		Mike Murphy 54 saves / 57 shots

=== Semi-final ===
May 23	Kitchener Rangers	9–0	Belleville Bulls	Kitchener Memorial Auditorium, Kitchener	Recap
Nazem Kadri 1 - 0:46; Matthew Halischuk 4 - 8:46; Justin Azevedo 2 - 13:28; Nick Spaling 2 - 15:17		First period	No scoring
Justin Azevedo 3 - 6:57; Mike Duco 1 - 14:04; Justin Azevedo 4 - 15:45		Second period	No scoring
Matthew Halischuk 5 - 6:31; Scott Tregunna 2 - pp - 19:43		Third period	No scoring
Josh Unice 25 saves / 25 shots		Goalie stats	Mike Murphy 29 saves / 38 shots

=== Final ===
May 25	Kitchener Rangers	1–4	Spokane Chiefs	Kitchener Memorial Auditorium, Kitchener	Recap
Brandon Mashinter 1 - 5:01		First period	16:10 - pp - Judd Blackwater 1
No scoring		Second period	4:11 - Drayson Bowman 6; 5:12 - pp - Trevor Glass 1
No scoring		Third period	19:04 - en - Jared Cowen 1
Josh Unice 22 saves / 25 shots		Goalie stats	Dustin Tokarski 53 saves / 54 shots

== Leading scorers ==
Player	GP	G	A	Pts	PIM
Justin Azevedo, Kitchener	5	4	7	11	2
Matthew Halischuk, Kitchener	5	5	4	9	0
Drayson Bowman, Spokane	4	6	2	8	0
Nick Spaling, Kitchener	5	2	6	8	2
Mitch Wahl, Spokane	4	2	4	6	2
Mikkel Boedker, Kitchener	5	2	4	6	0
Chris Bruton, Spokane	4	0	6	6	0
Shawn Matthias, Belleville	4	4	1	5	2
Cory Tanaka, Belleville	4	4	1	5	2
Michael Stinziani, Gatineau	3	2	3	5	0
Adam Perry, Belleville	4	0	5	5	6

== Leading goaltenders ==
Goalies Have To Play A Minimum Of 60 Minutes To Be Listed.

Player	GP	W	L	MINS	GA	GAA	SO	Sv%
Dustin Tokarski, Spokane	4	4	0	245	7	1.72	0	.953
Josh Unice, Kitchener	5	2	3	316	14	2.66	1	.897
Ryan Mior, Gatineau	3	0	3	142	14	4.49	0	.901
Mike Murphy, Belleville	4	2	2	254	20	4.73	0	.890

== Award winners ==
- Stafford Smythe Memorial Trophy (MVP): Dustin Tokarski, Spokane
- George Parsons Trophy (Sportsmanship): Matthew Halischuk, Kitchener
- Hap Emms Memorial Trophy (Goaltender): Dustin Tokarski, Spokane
- Ed Chynoweth Trophy (Leading Scorer): Justin Azevedo, Kitchener

All-star team

- Goal: Dustin Tokarski, Spokane
- Defence: Ben Shutron, Kitchener; Justin Falk, Spokane
- Forwards: Justin Azevedo, Kitchener; Drayson Bowman, Spokane; Mitch Wahl, Spokane

== Road to the cup ==
=== OHL Playoffs ===
Conference Quarter-finals	Conference Semi-finals
1	Belleville	4
8	Peterborough	1
1	Belleville	4
7	Barrie	0
2	Brampton	1
7	Barrie	4
Eastern
3	Oshawa	4
6	Ottawa	0
3	Oshawa	4
4	Niagara	2
4	Niagara	4
5	Mississauga	0
1	Kitchener	4
8	Plymouth	0
1	Kitchener	4
6	Sarnia	0
3	Windsor	1
6	Sarnia	4
Western
2	Sault Ste. Marie	4
7	Saginaw	0
2	Sault Ste. Marie	4
5	Guelph	1
4	London	1
5	Guelph	4

Conference Finals
1	Belleville	4
3	Oshawa	1
1	Kitchener	4
2	Sault Ste. Marie	1

OHL Championship
E1	Belleville	3
W1	Kitchener	4

=== QMJHL Playoffs ===
Division quarterfinals	Division semifinals
E1	Halifax	4
E8^{†}	Victoriaville	2
E1	Halifax	4
E4	Cape Breton	1
E4	Cape Breton	4
E5	Lewiston	2
Eastern Division
E2	Saint John	4
E7	P.E.I.	0
E2	Saint John	4
E3	Acadie-Bathurst	2
E3	Acadie-Bathurst	4
E6	St. John's	2
T1	Rouyn-Noranda	4
T8	Val-d'Or	0
T1	Rouyn-Noranda	4
T7	Rimouski	0
T2	Baie-Comeau	1
T7	Rimouski	4
Telus Division
T3	Gatineau	4
T6	Shawinigan	1
T3	Gatineau	4
T5	Québec	1
T4	Chicoutimi	2
T5	Québec	4

Semifinals
E1	Halifax	0
T3	Gatineau	4
T1	Rouyn-Noranda	4
E2	Saint John	0

Finals
T3	Gatineau	4
T1	Rouyn-Noranda	1

^{†}Victoriaville seeded 8th in Eastern division.

=== WHL Playoffs ===
Conference Quarter-finals	Conference Semi-finals
1	Calgary	4
8	Moose Jaw	2
1	Calgary	4
7	Swift Current	2
2	Regina	2
7	Swift Current	4
Eastern
3	Lethbridge	4
6	Brandon	2
3	Lethbridge	4
5	Kootenay	1
4	Medicine Hat	1
5	Kootenay	4
1	Tri-City	4
8	Kamloops	0
1	Tri-City	4
4	Seattle	1
4	Seattle	4
5	Kelowna	3
Western
2	Vancouver	4
7	Chilliwack	0
2	Vancouver	2
3	Spokane	4
3	Spokane	4
6	Everett	0

Conference Finals
1	Calgary	0
3	Lethbridge	4
1	Tri-City	3
3	Spokane	4

WHL Championship
E3	Lethbridge	0
W3	Spokane	4
