= Mitch Wahl =

American professional ice hockey player (born 1990)

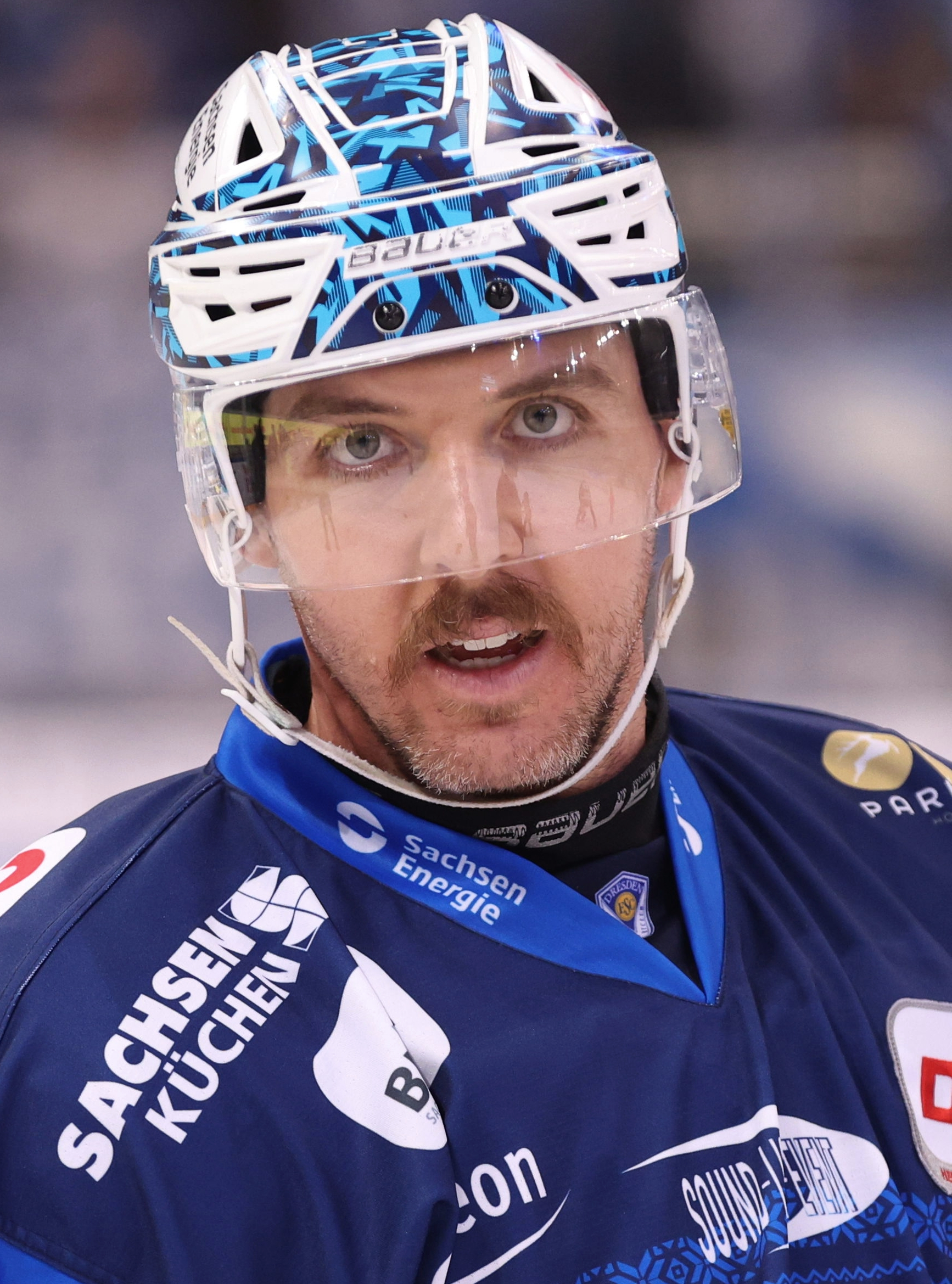
- Born: January 22, 1990 (age 36) Seal Beach, California, U.S.
- Height: 6 ft 0 in (183 cm)
- Weight: 199 lb (90 kg; 14 st 3 lb)
- Position: Center
- Shoots: Right
- team Former teams: Idaho Steelheads; Abbotsford Heat; Hamilton Bulldogs; Adirondack Phantoms; EC Red Bull Salzburg; Utica Comets; IK Oskarshamn; Ilves; Västerviks IK; HC TWK Innsbruck; EC KAC; HC '05 Banská Bystrica; Fischtown Pinguins; Schwenninger Wild Wings; Dresdner Eislöwen
- NHL draft: 48th overall, 2008; Calgary Flames
- Playing career: 2010–present

Mitch Wahl (born January 22, 1990) is an American professional ice hockey player for the Idaho Steelheads in the ECHL. He was selected in the second round (48th overall) of the 2008 NHL entry draft by the Calgary Flames.

Wahl played four years of junior hockey with the Spokane Chiefs of the Western Hockey League (WHL), winning the WHL championship and Memorial Cup in 2008. He was named a First Team All-Star by the WHL in 2009–10 before turning professional at the conclusion of his junior season. He was a member of the American junior team at the 2009 World Junior Ice Hockey Championships.

== Personal ==
Wahl grew up in Seal Beach, California. His parents, Mitch Sr. and Michelle, knew little about hockey but enrolled him in the sport after he showed an aptitude for skating during a birthday party for his elder sister. He began playing at the age of six, and credits the arrival of Wayne Gretzky with the Los Angeles Kings for creating opportunities for himself and other players in southern California. Wahl is also an avid surfer.

== Playing career ==
Wahl played minor hockey with the California Wave, and caught the attention of WHL scouts while playing in tournaments in Vancouver, Kamloops and Medicine Hat. He was selected in the first round, fourth overall, by the Spokane Chiefs in the 2005 WHL Bantam Draft. After appearing in two games with the Chiefs in 2005–06, Wahl joined the team full-time in 2006–07, scoring 16 goals and 48 points in 69 games. He improved to 73 points in 2007–08, and added 14 points in 21 playoff games as the Chiefs won the Ed Chynoweth Cup as league champions. At the 2008 Memorial Cup tournament, Wahl scored six points in four games to help the Chiefs win the Canadian Hockey League (CHL) championship.

Wahl's success attracted the attention of the Calgary Flames, who selected him with their second pick, 48th overall, at the 2008 NHL entry draft. He also joined the United States men's national junior ice hockey team for the 2009 World Junior Ice Hockey Championships, scoring four points for the fifth place Americans. He finished the 2008–09 WHL season with 32 goals and 63 points. In 2009–10, he finished sixth in league scoring with 96 points and was named a First Team All-Star by the WHL. He ended his WHL career in sixth place all-time in scoring for the Chiefs with 284 points and third all-time in assists with 186. The team also named him one of the top 25 players in their first 25 seasons. Upon the conclusion of his WHL season, Wahl joined the Flames's AHL affiliate, the Abbotsford Heat. He played in four regular season games, scoring a goal and three assists, and remained with the team into the 2010 Calder Cup playoffs.

He was traded to the Philadelphia Flyers on February 25, 2013 for Mike Testwuide. The Flyers did not tender him a qualifying offer in the off-season, making him an unrestricted free agent.

On August 5, 2013, Wahl signed his first European contract as a free agent, agreeing to a one-year deal with Austrian club, EC Red Bull Salzburg of the EBEL.

On June 25, 2014, Wahl returned to North America, signing a one-year contract with the Florida Everblades in the ECHL. After producing 59 points in 53 games with the Everblades in the 2014–15 season, Wahl returned to Europe to sign a one-year contract with Swedish second division club, IK Oskarshamn of the Allsvenskan on July 1, 2015.

Wahl started the 2019–20 season with HC '05 Banská Bystrica in Slovakia's top-tier Slovak Extraliga, but signed a mid-season contract with the Fischtown Pinguins in Germany's top-tier DEL. The Pinguins immediately sent him down to Eispiraten Crimmitschau, their farm team in the DEL2, where he played out the season. Wahl was a semi-regular in the lineup of the Pinguins for the 2020–21 DEL season, then started the 2021–22 DEL season with the team before being sent down to the EC Kassel Huskies of the DEL2. On May 27, 2022, Wahl continued his German journeyman career, agreeing to a one-year contract with the Schwenninger Wild Wings for the 2022-23 DEL season. Wahl appeared in 22 games of the 58-game Wild Wings season, collecting 1 goals and 6 points. Unable to help the team advance to the post-season, it was announced Wahl's contract would not be renewed.

Wahl signed with Dresdner Eislöwen of the DEL2 for the 2023–24 season, appearing in 6 games of the team's 52-game regular season. Wahl had already seen limited ice time when, on December 30, 2023, he injured his hand during an on-ice altercation against EV Landshut, earning a two-game suspension; with surgery on the hand, he was unable to play for most of the remainder of the season. At some point, Wahl became a German citizen, with the Dresdner Eislöwen website showing him with a dual German-American nationality.

== Career statistics ==
=== Regular season and playoffs ===
			Regular season					Playoffs
Season	Team	League	GP	G	A	Pts	PIM	GP	G	A	Pts	PIM
2005–06	Spokane Chiefs	WHL	2	0	0	0	0	—	—	—	—	—
2006–07	Spokane Chiefs	WHL	69	16	32	48	40	4	0	1	1	5
2007–08	Spokane Chiefs	WHL	67	20	53	73	63	21	6	8	14	20
2008–09	Spokane Chiefs	WHL	63	32	35	67	78	12	2	11	13	6
2009–10	Spokane Chiefs	WHL	72	30	66	96	96	7	4	5	9	8
2009–10	Abbotsford Heat	AHL	4	1	3	4	0	12	2	4	6	4
2010–11	Abbotsford Heat	AHL	17	1	4	5	0	—	—	—	—	—
2011–12	Utah Grizzlies	ECHL	38	20	20	40	95	3	0	0	0	2
2011–12	Abbotsford Heat	AHL	5	0	0	0	0	—	—	—	—	—
2011–12	Hamilton Bulldogs	AHL	22	2	3	5	6	—	—	—	—	—
2012–13	Utah Grizzlies	ECHL	45	19	40	59	115	4	0	2	2	2
2012–13	Abbotsford Heat	AHL	6	1	0	1	4	—	—	—	—	—
2012–13	Adirondack Phantoms	AHL	15	1	3	4	6	—	—	—	—	—
2013–14	EC Red Bull Salzburg	EBEL	5	0	1	1	9	—	—	—	—	—
2013–14	Idaho Steelheads	ECHL	65	17	39	56	160	10	0	1	1	23
2013–14	Utica Comets	AHL	2	0	0	0	2	—	—	—	—	—
2014–15	Florida Everblades	ECHL	53	15	44	59	94	8	3	3	6	6
2015–16	IK Oskarshamn	Allsv	52	27	13	40	77	5	1	2	3	0
2016–17	Ilves	Liiga	16	1	3	4	10	—	—	—	—	—
2016–17	Västerviks IK	Allsv	23	6	8	14	18	—	—	—	—	—
2016–17	IK Oskarshamn	Allsv	8	1	5	6	16	—	—	—	—	—
2017–18	HC TWK Innsbruck	EBEL	45	16	38	54	117	6	1	4	5	6
2018–19	EC KAC	EBEL	54	19	23	42	10	15	2	5	7	4
2019–20	HC '05 Banská Bystrica	Slovak	10	6	3	9	4	—	—	—	—	—
2019–20	Eispiraten Crimmitschau	DEL2	34	12	22	34	66	—	—	—	—	—
2020–21	Fischtown Pinguins	DEL	28	7	12	19	18	3	2	0	2	8
2021–22	Fischtown Pinguins	DEL	17	2	0	2	12	—	—	—	—	—
2021–22	EC Kassel Huskies	DEL2	34	15	22	37	55	7	1	3	4	2
2022–23	Schwenninger Wild Wings	DEL	22	1	5	6	10	—	—	—	—	—
2023–24	Dresdner Eislöwen	DEL2	6	2	3	5	8	—	—	—	—	—
2024–25	Dresdner Eislöwen	DEL2	32	5	6	11	25	—	—	—	—	—
AHL totals			71	6	13	19	24	12	2	4	6	4

=== International ===
Year	Team	Event	Result	GP	G	A	Pts	PIM
2009	United States	WJC	5th	6	1	3	4	2
Junior totals				6	1	3	4	2

== Awards and honors ==
Award	Year
Junior
CHL Memorial Cup All-Star Team	2008
WHL First All-Star Team	2009–10
