= Chris Bruton =

Canadian ice hockey player (born 1987)

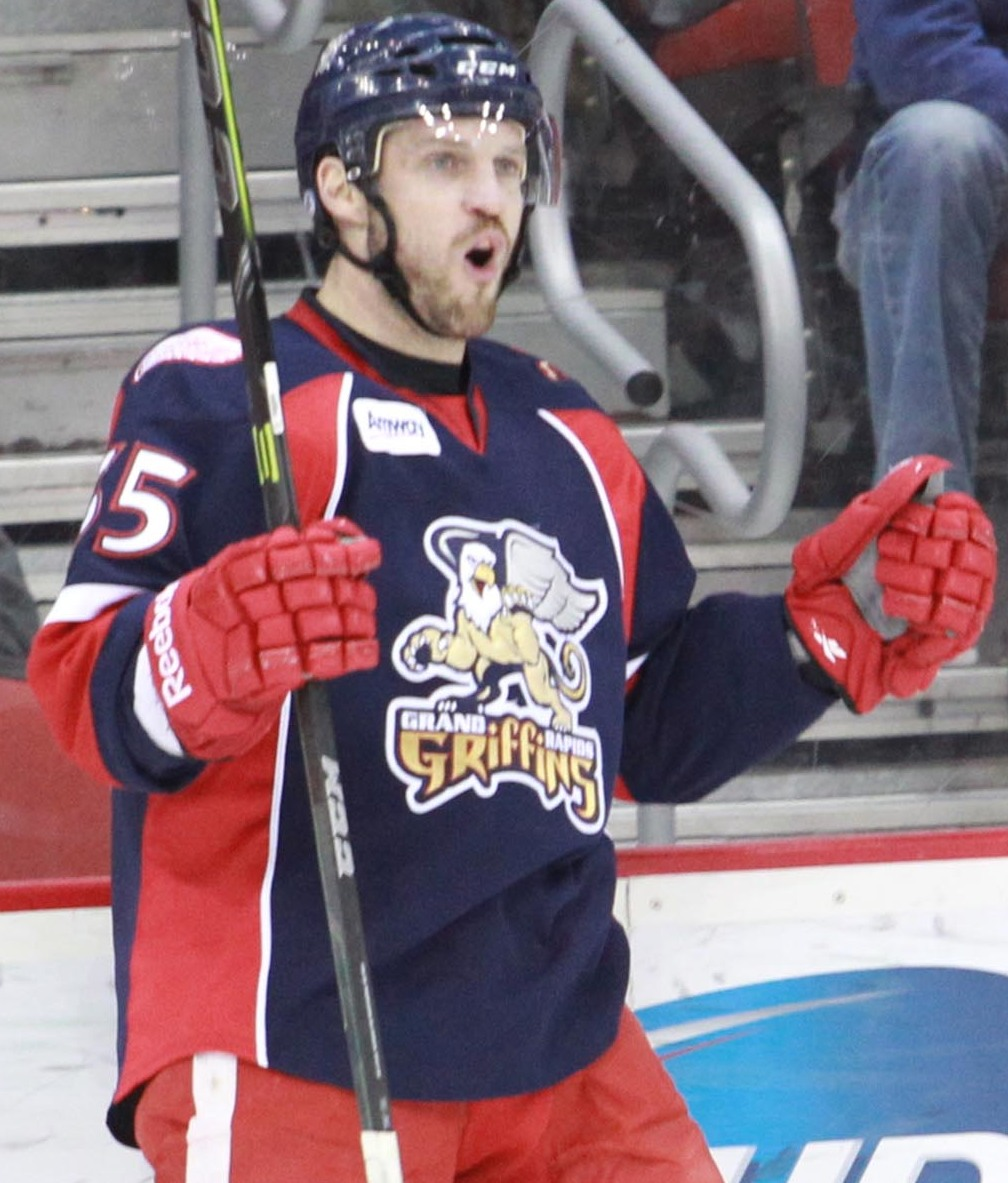
- Bruton with the Grand Rapids Griffins in 2015
- Born: January 23, 1987 (age 39) Calgary, Alberta, Canada
- Height: 5 ft 11 in (180 cm)
- Weight: 176 lb (80 kg; 12 st 8 lb)
- Position: Centre
- Shot: Right
- Played for: Peoria Rivermen; Bridgeport Sound Tigers; Grand Rapids Griffins; Braehead Clan; Coventry Blaze
- NHL draft: Undrafted
- Playing career: 2011–2016

Chris Bruton (born January 23, 1987) is a Canadian former professional ice hockey player, who most notably played in the American Hockey League (AHL).

== Playing career ==
On May 21, 2013, the New York Islanders of the National Hockey League (NHL) signed Chris to a one-year, two-way contract. After attending the Islanders 2013 training camp, he was assigned to their AHL affiliate, the Bridgeport Sound Tigers, for the duration of the 2013–14 season.

On July 30, 2015, Bruton left the AHL and signed a one-year contract with Scottish club, Braehead Clan of the EIHL, before being traded and ending his professional career with the Coventry Blaze.

== Career statistics ==
			Regular season					Playoffs
Season	Team	League	GP	G	A	Pts	PIM	GP	G	A	Pts	PIM
2004–05	Spokane Chiefs	WHL	62	11	17	28	55	—	—	—	—	—
2005–06	Spokane Chiefs	WHL	66	12	14	26	111	—	—	—	—	—
2006–07	Spokane Chiefs	WHL	63	9	12	21	103	6	1	1	2	6
2007–08	Spokane Chiefs	WHL	67	26	37	63	99	21	3	7	10	6
2008–09	Acadia University	CIS	26	15	14	29	62	—	—	—	—	—
2009–10	Acadia University	CIS	24	11	13	24	20	—	—	—	—	—
2010–11	Acadia University	CIS	19	8	13	21	36	—	—	—	—	—
2011–12	Alaska Aces	ECHL	27	6	7	13	60	4	0	3	3	19
2011–12	Peoria Rivermen	AHL	38	2	3	5	66	—	—	—	—	—
2012–13	Peoria Rivermen	AHL	69	4	6	10	134	—	—	—	—	—
2013–14	Bridgeport Sound Tigers	AHL	41	2	2	4	91	—	—	—	—	—
2014–15	Grand Rapids Griffins	AHL	52	2	2	4	124	—	—	—	—	—
2015–16	Braehead Clan	EIHL	34	17	16	33	80	—	—	—	—	—
2015–16	Coventry Blaze	EIHL	16	7	16	23	43	4	4	3	7	12
AHL totals			200	10	13	23	415	—	—	—	—	—

== Awards and honors ==
Award	Year
CHL
Memorial Cup (Spokane Chiefs)	2008
CIS
AUS All-Rookie Team	2009
