= Justin Azevedo =

Canadian ice hockey player (born 1988)

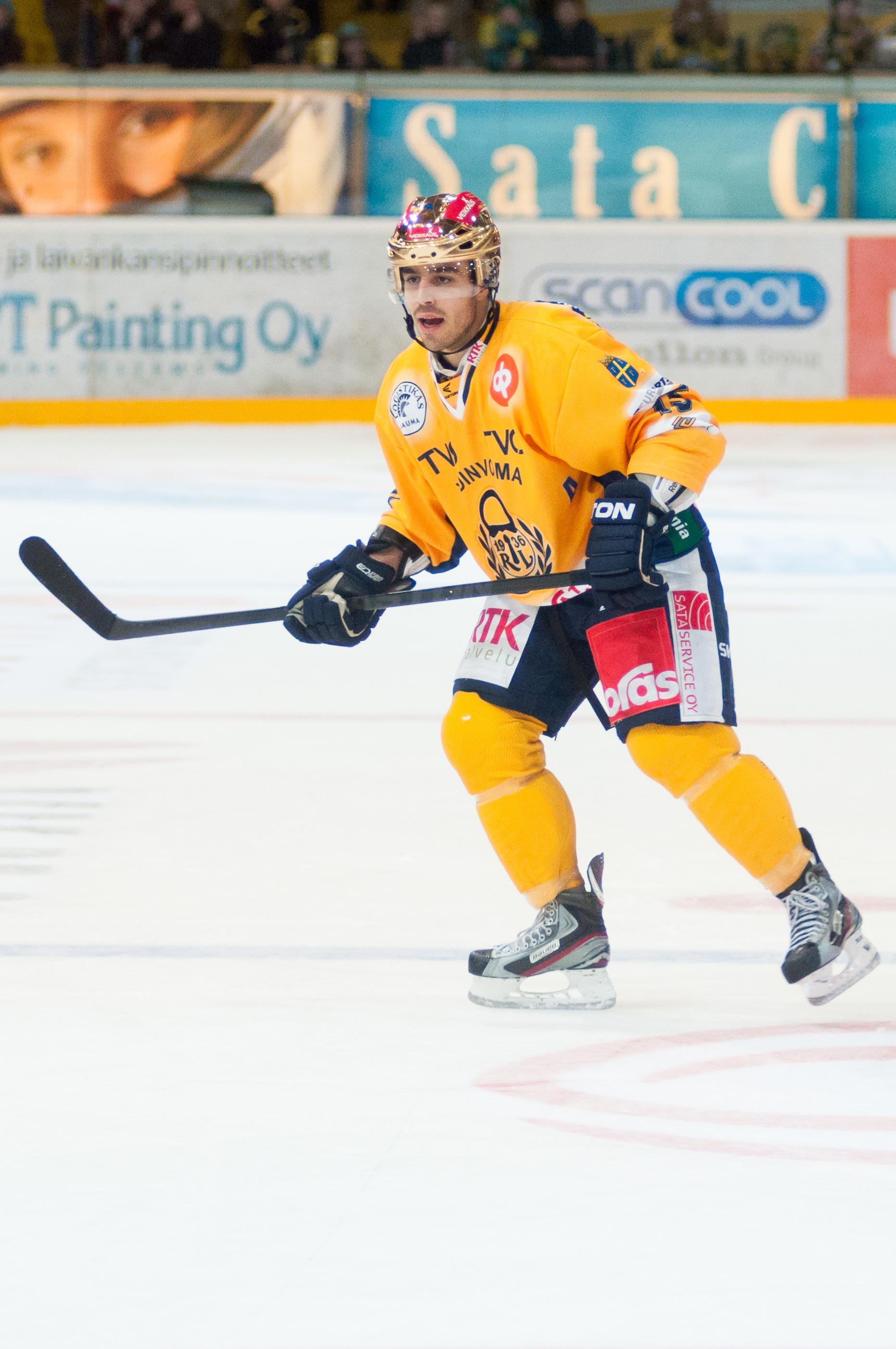
- Azevedo with Lukko in 2012
- Born: April 1, 1988 (age 38) West Lorne, Ontario, Canada
- Height: 5 ft 8 in (173 cm)
- Weight: 175 lb (79 kg; 12 st 7 lb)
- Position: Centre
- Shot: Right
- NL team: ZSC Lions
- Played for: Manchester Monarchs; Lukko Rauma; HC Lev Praha; Ak Bars Kazan
- NHL draft: 153rd overall, 2008; Los Angeles Kings
- Playing career: 2008–2023

Justin Azevedo (born April 1, 1988) is a Portuguese-Canadian former professional ice hockey forward and current skills coach for the Collingwood Blues of the OJHL.

== Playing career ==
=== Junior ===
Azevedo played his first OHL game on September 24, 2004 as a member of the Kitchener Rangers. During the 2007–08 OHL season, Azevedo won six awards, which included the Red Tilson Trophy for the most outstanding player in the OHL, Eddie Powers Memorial Trophy for being the top scorer in the OHL, Ed Chynoweth Trophy for being the top scorer of the Memorial Cup, CHL Player of the Year, CHL Top Scorer Award, and Wayne Gretzky 99 Award for being the most outstanding player in the OHL playoffs.

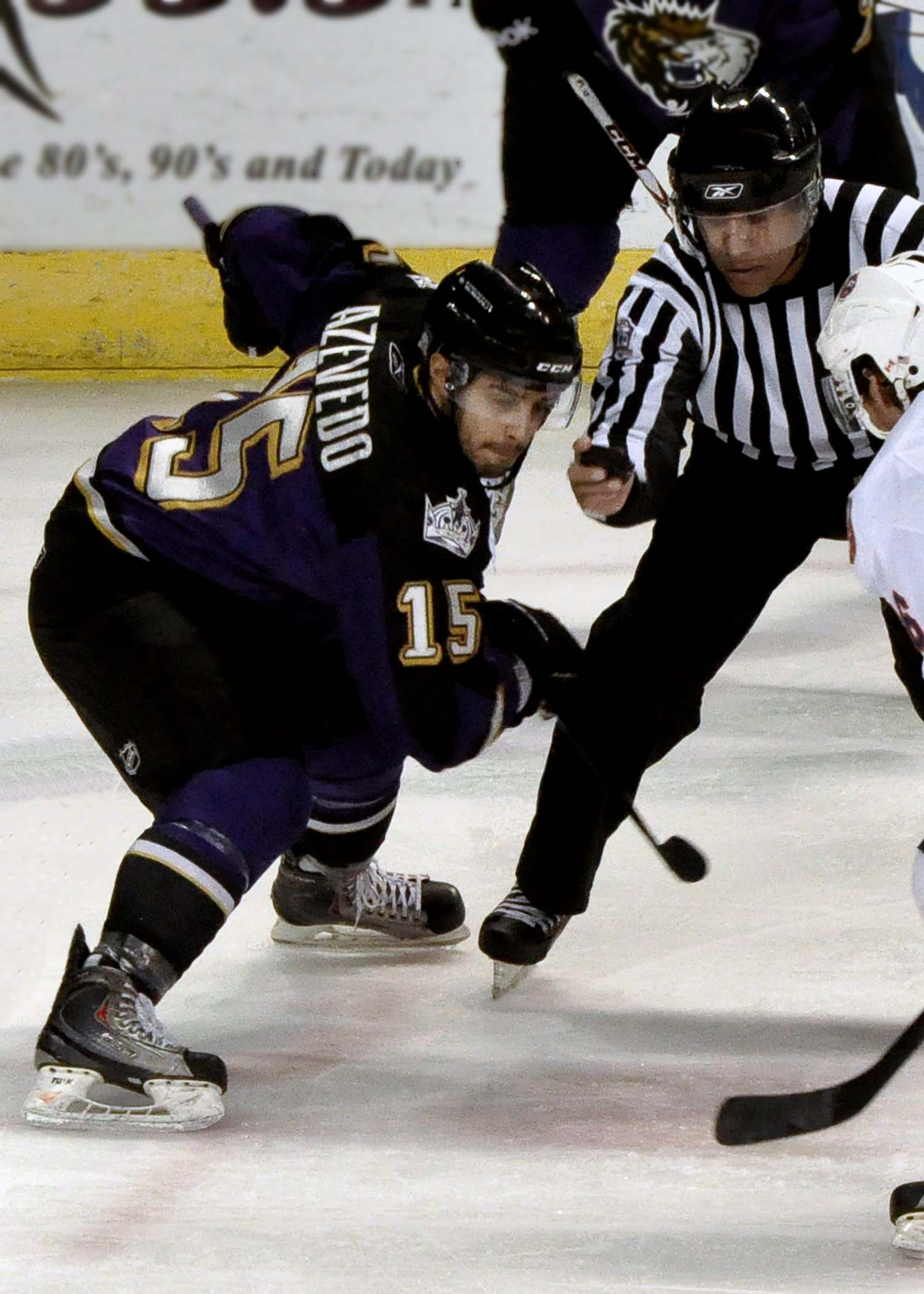

=== Professional ===
Azevedo was drafted 153rd overall, in the sixth round, of the 2008 NHL entry draft by the Los Angeles Kings. As an older draft pick, Azevedo immediately turned professional and was signed by the Kings' American Hockey League (AHL) affiliate, the Manchester Monarchs, on August 10, 2008. After attending the Kings' training camp on September 29, 2008, he was assigned to the Monarchs for the 2008–09 season.

Despite missing significant parts of the season with the Monarchs suffering two injuries, Azevedo scored 36 points in 49 games to earn a two-year entry-level contract with the Kings on July 20, 2009.

Azevedo was one of two players, alongside left wing Brandon Kozun, to be awarded a penalty shot in the same game during Manchester's 5–2 victory over the Providence Bruins, a franchise record for the Monarchs.

On June 7, 2012, Azevedo signed with Lukko Rauma in the Finnish SM-liiga. In his first European season in 2012–13, Azevedo made a comfortable transition with Lukko, leading the SM-liiga amongst rookies with 38 assists and 58 points. Azevedo lead the entire league in playoffs scoring with 10 goals and 18 points in only 14 games to also earn a selection in the SM-liiga All-Star Team.

On April 15, 2013, Azevedo opted to play in the Kontinental Hockey League (KHL), signing a multi-year contract with Czech-based club HC Lev Praha for the 2013–14 season. Azevedo contributed with 9 goals and 27 assists in 48 games for Lev before stepping up in the playoffs for a second consecutive season, to post 13 goals and 20 points in 22 games.

Despite reaching the Gagarin Cup finals, Lev announced they would not continue participation due to bankruptcy. On July 1, 2014, Azevedo was transferred to fellow KHL club Ak Bars Kazan in exchange for financial compensation.

== Career statistics ==
=== Regular season and playoffs ===
			Regular season					Playoffs
Season	Team	League	GP	G	A	Pts	PIM	GP	G	A	Pts	PIM
2004–05	Kitchener Rangers	OHL	58	18	21	39	39	15	3	1	4	14
2005–06	Kitchener Rangers	OHL	60	29	40	69	80	5	0	3	3	12
2006–07	Kitchener Rangers	OHL	50	17	39	56	42	9	4	11	15	22
2007–08	Kitchener Rangers	OHL	67	43	81	124	69	20	10	26	36	33
2008–09	Manchester Monarchs	AHL	49	12	24	36	31	—	—	—	—	—
2009–10	Manchester Monarchs	AHL	46	14	13	27	31	16	3	6	9	12
2010–11	Manchester Monarchs	AHL	79	18	35	53	71	7	3	7	10	10
2011–12	Manchester Monarchs	AHL	63	28	22	50	37	4	1	1	2	4
2012–13	Lukko	SM-l	58	20	38	58	88	14	10	8	18	6
2013–14	Lev Prague	KHL	48	9	18	27	34	22	13	7	20	6
2014–15	Ak Bars Kazan	KHL	58	17	33	50	48	20	5	6	11	18
2015–16	Ak Bars Kazan	KHL	59	17	36	53	26	7	1	1	2	8
2016–17	Ak Bars Kazan	KHL	54	13	21	34	34	15	3	7	10	8
2017–18	Ak Bars Kazan	KHL	31	15	13	28	22	19	9	15	24	6
2018–19	Ak Bars Kazan	KHL	62	13	25	38	42	4	0	4	4	2
2019–20	Ak Bars Kazan	KHL	57	13	24	37	43	4	1	0	1	0
2020–21	Ak Bars Kazan	KHL	30	5	17	22	24	—	—	—	—	—
2021–22	ZSC Lions	NL	45	8	31	39	57	18	4	7	11	8
2022–23	ZSC Lions	NL	31	6	10	16	43	8	1	6	7	4
AHL totals			237	72	94	166	170	27	7	14	21	26
KHL totals			399	102	187	289	273	91	32	40	72	48

=== International ===
Year	Team	Event	Result	GP	G	A	Pts	PIM
2005	Canada Ontario	U17	4th	6	2	4	6	8
2006	Canada	U18	4th	7	4	4	8	20
Junior totals				13	6	8	14	28

== Awards and honours ==
Award	Year
OHL
First All-Star Team	2008
Red Tilson Trophy	2008
Eddie Powers Trophy	2008
Wayne Gretzky 99 Award	2008
CHL First All-Star Team	2008
CHL Ed Chynoweth Trophy	2008
CHL Player of the Year	2008
Memorial Cup All-Star Team	2008
Liiga
All-Star Team	2013
KHL
First All-Star Team	2014, 2018
All-Star Game	2015
Gagarin Cup (Ak Bars Kazan)	2018
Playoff MVP	2018

Awards and achievements
Preceded by John Tavares	CHL Player of the Year; 2008	Succeeded by Cody Hodgson
