= Memorial Cup =

Championship trophy of the Canadian Hockey League

- The Memorial Cup at the 2015 tournament
- Sport: Ice hockey
- Awarded for: Canadian Hockey League champion

History
- First award: 1919
- First winner: University of Toronto Schools
- Most wins: Toronto Marlboros (7)
- Most recent: Kitchener Rangers (3)

The Memorial Cup (French: Coupe Memorial) is the national championship of the Canadian Hockey League (CHL), a consortium of three major junior ice hockey leagues operating in Canada and parts of the United States. It is a four-team round-robin tournament played among the champions of the Ontario Hockey League (OHL), Quebec Maritimes Junior Hockey League (QMJHL) and Western Hockey League (WHL), and a host team, which alternates on an annual basis between the three member leagues. The Memorial Cup trophy was established by Captain James T. Sutherland to honour those who died in service during World War I. It was rededicated during the 2010 tournament to honour all Canadians who have died in conflict.

The trophy was originally known as the OHA Memorial Cup and was donated by the Ontario Hockey Association (OHA) in 1919 to be awarded to the junior ice hockey champion of Canada. From its inception until 1971, the Memorial Cup was open to all Junior A teams in the country and was awarded following a series of league, provincial and regional playoffs culminating in an east–west championship. The three-league tournament format began in 1972, a season after the Canadian Amateur Hockey Association divided the Junior A rank into two tiers, naming the Memorial Cup as the championship of the Major Junior level.

The Memorial Cup is sometimes referred to as one of the hardest championships to win in hockey, factoring in the number of teams across the CHL's member leagues nationwide, the Memorial Cup tournament being played between their top teams, and the limited eligibility period for players to compete at the major junior level.

== History ==
Capt. Sutherland, who was serving overseas, was President of the Ontario Hockey Association and he brought forward the idea to present a trophy to honour all the young Canadian hockey players who died in battle and have it awarded to the best junior hockey team in Canada. The Ontario Hockey Association (OHA)'s annual meeting was unanimous that a fitting memorial be established to members of the OHA who had fallen on the field of war.

"Past President Capt. J. T. Sutherland, now in France, spoke of the splendid work done by Canadian boys in France and suggested the erection of a suitable memorial to hockey players who have fallen."—The Globe, Toronto, Ontario, Dec. 9, 1918.

"The (Memorial) cup, coveted prize of Canadian junior hockey, was the brainchild of Capt. Jim (Sutherland) when he was overseas in the Great War (1914–18) and at the time, President of the Ontario Hockey Association (1915–17). He wrote suggesting the trophy in memory of the boys who were killed in the war and no doubt a big part of the idea was instigated by his devotion to his beloved (Alan) Scotty Davidson*, who fell (June 6, 1915) with many other hockey players in the world conflict (including Capt. George T. Richardson*, who died in France, Feb. 9, 1916. (*Both are members of the Hockey Hall of Fame.) --William J. Walshe, Comments on Sport, The Kingston Whig-Standard, January 6, 1939.

It started as an East-versus-West format, where the George Richardson Memorial Trophy champions from the East would play the Abbott Cup champions from the West.

From 1919 to 1928, the Memorial Cup Final was a two-game total goals affair between a champion from Eastern Canada and a champion from Western Canada, both of which were determined through a series of playdowns under the auspices of the Canadian Amateur Hockey Association. In 1929, the Memorial Cup Final became a best-of-three series.

In 1934, when the junior hockey teams were further divided between Junior 'A' and Junior 'B', the Memorial Cup served as the Junior 'A' championship trophy, and the Sutherland Cup became the Junior 'B' trophy. From 1937 the Memorial Cup was a best-of-five series, and in 1943 reverted to a best-of-seven series.

For the 1970–1971 season, the Junior 'A' rank was further split into the Major Junior rank and a second-tier rank (referred nowadays as Junior 'A'), with the Memorial Cup serving as the Major Junior championship trophy, and the Manitoba Centennial Trophy, and later the Royal Bank Cup, serving as the second tier championship trophy.

In 1972, the Memorial Cup was contested between three teams: the champions of the three leagues of the Canadian Hockey League: the Ed Chynoweth Cup Champs (WHL), J. Ross Robertson Cup Champs (OHL), and the President's Cup Champs (QMJHL). From 1972 to 1973 these three teams played a single round-robin (two games each), with the top two teams advancing to a single-game final. A semi-final game was added in 1974. In 1977, the tournament was expanded to a double round-robin (four games each), with no semi-final. The tournament was held at a pre-determined site which was rotated among the three leagues.

The 1983 Memorial Cup tournament saw the inclusion of a fourth team, the team hosting the event, which was done to boost tournament attendance. The first tournament under this format was held in Portland, Oregon, and marked the first time that an American city hosted the Memorial Cup. The host Winter Hawks also won the Cup that year, becoming the first American team to win the Memorial Cup, as well as becoming the first host team to win it. The four teams played a single round-robin (three games each). If two teams are tied for third place, then a tie-breaker game is played on Thursday, followed by a semi-final game between the second and third-place teams and a final between the first-place team and the semi-final winner. This format continues to be used to this day, with the honour of hosting the tournament rotated amongst the CHL's three member leagues.

If the host team also wins its respective league championship, the Memorial Cup berth reserved for the league champion is instead awarded to that league's runner-up. This was the case in 2006, when the Quebec Remparts lost to the Moncton Wildcats in the QMJHL Finals. However, since Moncton was hosting the Memorial Cup that year, Quebec was awarded the QMJHL berth to the Memorial Cup tournament. The Remparts went on to win the Memorial Cup that season, the first time that a team has won the tournament without qualifying as the tournament host or as the champions of their respective league.

In the history of the cup, there have been two major mishaps with the cup itself. At the 2008 tournament, a replica trophy, which is the one teams are presented with on the ice after the game, broke apart as captain Chris Bruton of the victorious Spokane Chiefs tried to hand it off to a teammate after being presented the cup on the ice. The crowd started heckling after the replica cup broke apart, while the Chiefs took apart the trophy and shared it around with teammates. In 2012, defenceman Dillon Donnelly of the Shawinigan Cataractes accidentally dropped the trophy, significantly damaging it. The official cup is typically kept at the Hockey Hall of Fame in Toronto, Ontario, Canada.

Due to the COVID-19 pandemic, both the 2020 (scheduled for Kelowna) and the 2021 (to be hosted by the OHL) editions of the tournament were cancelled as a result of provincial restrictions. The QMJHL was the only league of the CHL to declare a champion during the 2020–21 season. The Memorial Cup tournament resumed in 2022.

== Champions ==
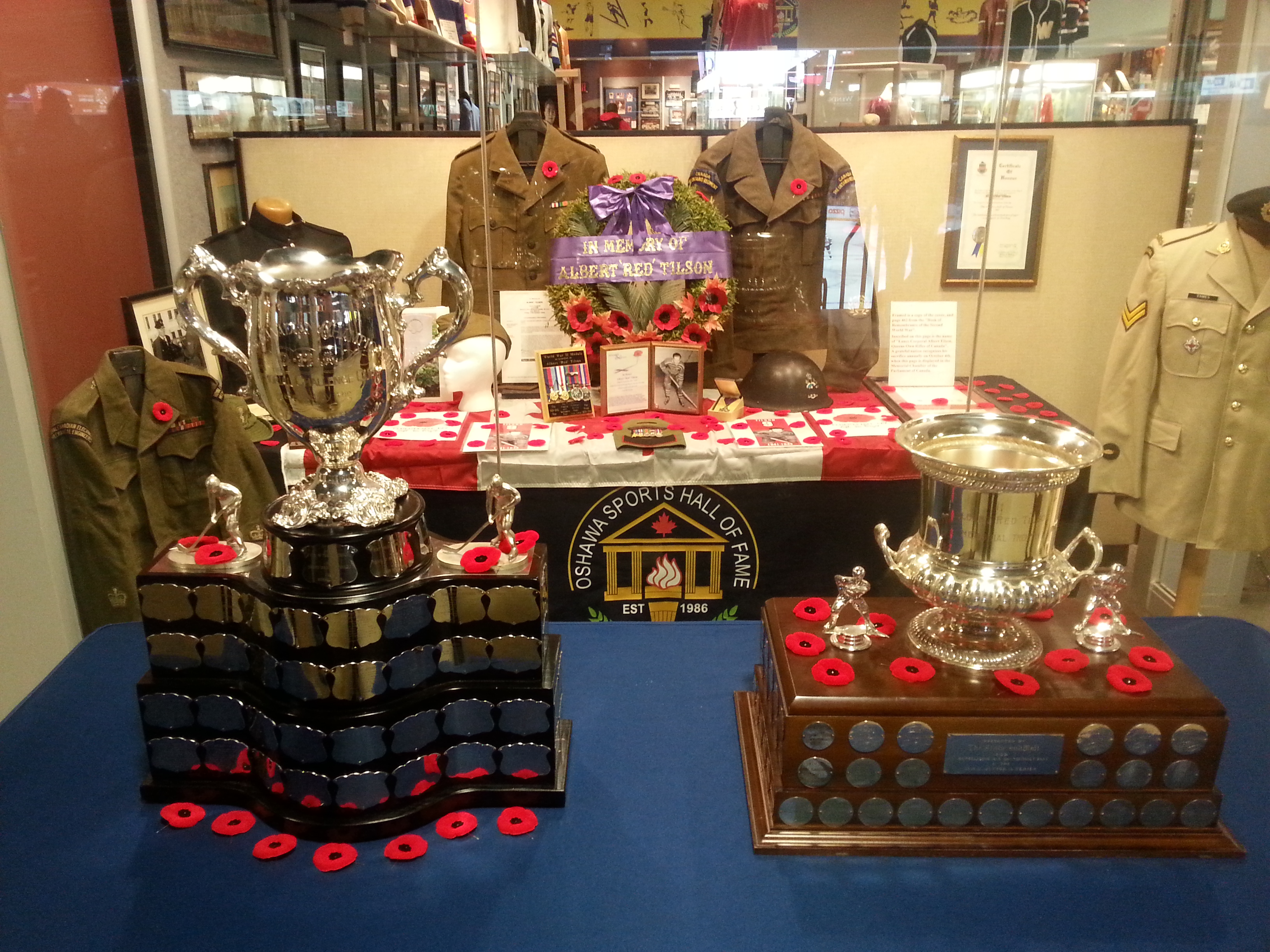
The Memorial Cup and the Red Tilson Trophy displayed at the Oshawa Sports Hall of Fame for Remembrance Day in 2019

== Memorial Cup awards ==
Starting in 1972, the Memorial Cup committee has awarded honours for play at the Memorial Cup tournament. There are now five annual awards presented.

Award	Description	Founded
Stafford Smythe Memorial Trophy	Most valuable player	1972
George Parsons Trophy	Most sportsmanlike player	1974
Hap Emms Memorial Trophy	Outstanding goaltender	1975
Ed Chynoweth Trophy	Leading scorer	1996
Memorial Cup All-Star Team	Best player at each position	1975
