= 2011 World U-17 Hockey Challenge =

Tournament details
- Host country: Canada
- Venue(s): MTS Centre, MTS Iceplex, PCU Centre (in 2 host cities)
- Dates: December 29 - January 4
- Teams: 10

The 2011 World Under-17 Hockey Challenge was an ice hockey tournament held in Winnipeg and Portage la Prairie, Manitoba, Canada between December 29, 2010 and January 4, 2011. The World Under-17 Hockey Challenge is held by Hockey Canada annually to showcase young hockey talent from across Canada and other strong hockey countries. The primary venues used for the tournament were the MTS Iceplex in Winnipeg and the PCU Centre in Portage la Prairie. The semi-final and medal games were played at the MTS Centre. Team Ontario captured the gold medal with a 5-3 victory over Team USA in front of a record crowd of 12,060 at the MTS Centre on January 4. Team Pacific (British Columbia & Alberta) claimed the bronze medal.

== Challenge results ==
=== Preliminary round ===
==== Group A ====
Team	Pld	W	OTW	OTL	L	GF	GA	GD	Pts
United States	4	4	0	0	0	26	6	+20	12
Canada Quebec	4	3	0	0	1	22	15	+7	9
Canada Atlantic	4	2	0	0	2	15	26	−11	6
Finland	4	1	0	0	3	12	16	−4	3
Germany	4	0	0	0	4	7	19	−12	0

===== Results =====
December 29, 2010	Canada Atlantic	3–9	Canada Quebec	PCU Centre, Portage la Prairie; Attendance: 502

A. Ryan (PP) 07:41; M. Bursey (PP) 56:01; N. MacKinnon (PP) 56:01 / Goals / 05:32 (PP) F. Gamelin; 27:09 (PP) L. Ciampini; 30:15 (ES) S. Hodhod; 35:23 (ES) F. Girard; 36:20 (ES) L. Ciampini; 39:46 (ES) J. Leduc; 41:17 (PP2) R. Lafontaine; 41:37 (PP) M. Matheson; 51:03 (PP) R. Lafontaine

December 29, 2010	Finland	2–5	United States	MTS Iceplex, Winnipeg

T. Nättinen (ES) 28:44; J. Ikonen (ES) 59:07 / Goals / 09:20 (ES) H. Samuelsson; 13:02 (ES) C. Carrick; 14:01 (ES) M. Lane; 21:11 (ES) H. Samuelsson; 28:28 (ES) N. Kerdiles

December 30, 2010	United States	4–1	Germany	PCU Centre, Portage la Prairie; Attendance: 487

H. Samuelsson (ES) 00:35; H. Samuelsson (ES) 04:06; H. Samuelsson (PP) 24:05; M. Knoules (PP) 38:00 / Goals / 02:22 (PP) L. Palausch

December 30, 2010	Canada Quebec	6–4	Finland	PCU Centre, Portage la Prairie; Attendance: 712

D. Fournier (ES) 05:53; L. Ciampini (ES) 39:40; C. Hudon (ES) 39:46; W. Carrier (ES) 48:27; L. Ciampini (ES) 50:56; L. Ciampini (ENG) 59:07 / Goals / 00:23 (ES) J. Ikonen; 15:24 (ES) H. Ikonen; 37:24 (ES) R. Ristolainen; 47:26 (ES) V. Pokka

December 31, 2010	Canada Quebec	5–3	Germany	MTS Iceplex, Winnipeg

R. Lafontaine (PP) 15:51; M. Matheson (PP) 24:22; W. Carrier (ES) 33:40; L. Ciampini (ES) 41:30; C. Hudon (PP) 53:18 / Goals / 20:54 (PP) J. Koslowski; 26:37 (ES) P. Klöpper; 47:22 (PP2) M. Eberhardt

December 31, 2010	Finland	3–4	Canada Atlantic	PCU Centre, Portage la Prairie; Attendance: 638

K. Torniainen (ES) 18:17; R. Kulmala (ES) 19:11; T. Teräväinen (SH) 20:31 / Goals / 03:57 (ES) N. MacKinnon; 22:46 (ES) B. Malone; 26:55 (ES) N. MacKinnon; 19:33 (PP) M. Bursey

January 1, 2011	Canada Atlantic	1–12	United States	MTS Iceplex, Winnipeg

J. Haché (PP) 10:26 / Goals / 08:40 (PP) H. Samuelsson; 09:00 (ES) F. Vatrano; 14:48 (ES) R. Hartman; 19:46 (ES) T. Di Pauli; 29:27 (PP) K. Osterberg; 30:45 (ES) M. Lane; 31:38 (ES) M. Koules; 32:15 (PP) J. Trouba; 35:06 (ES) M. Lane; 35:36 (PP) F. Vatrano; 46:01 (PP) B. Skjei; 53:03 (ES) C. Carrick

January 1, 2011	Germany	1–3	Finland	PCU Centre, Portage la Prairie; Attendance: 503

J. Möser (PP) 10:50 / Goals / 15:13 (ES) J. Tanus; 23:33 (ES) M. Lehtonen; 25:54 (PP) J. Ikonen

January 2, 2011	Germany	2–7	Canada Atlantic	PCU Centre, Portage la Prairie; Attendance: 466

F. Tiffels (ES) 20:53; S. Ziegler (ES) 55:01 / Goals / 07:16 (ES) S. Anderson; 25:09 (ES) Andrew Ryan; 28:04 (PP) N. MacKinnon; 30:29 (ES) N. MacKinnon; 42:18 (ES) B. Malone; 47:14 (ES) B. Pye; 52:57 (ES) L. O'Brien

January 2, 2011	United States	5–2	Canada Quebec	MTS Iceplex, Winnipeg

R. Hartman (SH) 07:10; S. Jones (PP) 12:46; M. Koules (ES) 18:28; S. Matteau (ES) 25:48; T. Di Pauli (ES) 39:58 / Goals / 06:40 (PP2) C. Hudon; 44:56 (ES) C. Hudon

==== Group B ====
Team	Pld	W	OTW	OTL	L	GF	GA	GD	Pts
Canada Ontario	4	4	0	0	0	20	6	+14	12
Canada Pacific	4	3	0	0	1	17	11	+6	9
Canada West	4	2	0	0	2	14	12	+2	6
Czech Republic	4	1	0	0	3	9	16	−7	3
Slovakia	4	0	0	0	4	5	20	−15	0

===== Results =====
December 29, 2010	Czech Republic	1–7	Canada Ontario	PCU Centre, Portage la Prairie; Attendance: 689

M. Matějček (PP) 31:54 / Goals / 07:39 (PP) S. Koekkoek; 24:46 (ES) M. Campagna; 24:52 (ES) C. Marchese; 27:42 (PP2) S. Laughton; 40:58 (ES) K. Rychel; 50:59 (ES) A. Anthanasiou; 57:51 (PP) G. Curcuruto

December 29, 2010	Canada West	2–5	Canada Pacific	MTS Iceplex, Winnipeg

C. Heffley (SH) 25:26; B. Harms (PP) 42:49 / Goals / 13:33 (PP2) G. Reinhart; 40:49 (ES) M. Winther; 48:16 (ES) R. Trzonkowski; 50:33 (PP) H. Shinkaruk; 52:22 (ES) B. Magee

December 30, 2010	Canada Pacific	3–2	Czech Republic	MTS Iceplex, Winnipeg

B. Magee (PP) 19:06; T. Bourke (PP) 25:39; H. Shinkaruk (ES) 45:42 / Goals / 10:19 (ES) Dominik Volek; 30:36 (ES) P. Sedláček

December 30, 2010	Slovakia	0–5	Canada Ontario	MTS Iceplex, Winnipeg

Goals / 06:33 (PP2) M. Campagna; 25:13 (ES) C. Marchese; 29:18 (PP) K. Rychel; 34:00 (ES) S. Monahan; 43:11 (PP) S. Laughton

December 31, 2010	Canada Pacific	7–3	Slovakia	PCU Centre, Portage la Prairie; Attendance: 421

R. Olsen (ES) 05:25; L. Bews (PP) 12:15; J. Erricson (PP) 13:04; R. Trzonkowski (ES) 25:51; M. Winther (ES) 28:51; T. Bourke (ES) 46:53; J. Erricson (ES) 57:57 / Goals / 06:38 (PP) J. Blaško; 13:43 (ES) M. Réway; 21:34 (ES) A. Štrauch

December 31, 2010	Czech Republic	2–5	Canada West	MTS Iceplex, Winnipeg

P. Machač (ES) 20:40; D. Volek (PP) 57:23 / Goals / 04:36 (PP) C. Stephenson; 07:56 (PP) B. Leipsic; 28:29 (PP) B. Cuthbert; 50:34 (ES) B. Stovin; 59:15 (ENG) L. McVeigh

January 1, 2011	Slovakia	1–4	Czech Republic	PCU Centre, Portage la Prairie; Attendance: 446

J. Blaško (PP) 27:31 / Goals / 02:52 (ES) J. Hudeček)9:54 (ES) M. Zadražil; 52:22 (ES) M. Psota; 59:25 (ENG) D. Volek

January 1, 2011	Canada Ontario	4–3	Canada West	MTS Iceplex, Winnipeg

B. Silk (ES) 00:15; A. Athanasiou (ES) 29:10; J. Graham (PP) 35:37; M. Marcantuoni (PP) 41:24 / Goals / 08:27 (ES) C. Stephenson; 14:51 (SH) C. Stephenson; 59:54 (PP) L. McVeigh

January 2, 2011	Canada Ontario	4–2	Canada Pacific	PCU Centre, Portage la Prairie; Attendance: 1182

B. Gaunce (PP) 20:24; M. Marcantuoni (PP) 30:42; M. Finn (ES) 31:32; B. Gaunce (PP) 38:50 / Goals / 08:20 (ES) H. Shinkaruk; 51:19 (PP) B. Magee

January 2, 2011	Canada West	4–1	Slovakia	MTS Iceplex, Winnipeg

B. Leipsic (PP) 01:39; R. Gow (ES) 28:32; C. Stephenson (ES) 41:06; R. Pulock (ES) 51:52 / Goals / 48:55 (ES) A. Štrauch

=== Final round ===
Semifinals
A1	United States	6*
B2	Canada Pacific	5
B1	Canada Ontario	2*
A2	Canada Quebec	1

Final
SF1	United States	3
SF2	Canada Ontario	5

* Decided in overtime.

==== Semifinals ====
January 3, 2011	Canada Pacific	5–6 (OT)	United States	MTS Centre, Winnipeg

B. Magee (ES) 01:13; H. Shinkaruk (PP) 35:58; T. Bourke (PP) 37:04; M. Rielly (ES) 42:20; M. Rielly (ES) 43:49 / Goals / 05:59 (ES) R. Hartman; 12:27 (PP) J. Trouba; 18:22 (ES) S. Matteau; 18:36 (ES) R. Hartman; 32:29 (PP) M. Grzelcyk; 67:24 (ES) N. Kerdiles

January 3, 2011	Canada Quebec	1–2 (OT)	Canada Ontario	MTS Centre, Winnipeg

C. Hudon (ES) 24:04 / Goals / 17:58 (ES) S. Monahan; 61:52 (ES) S. Monahan

==== 9th place game ====
January 3, 2011	Slovakia	5–8	Germany	PCU Centre, Portage la Prairie; Attendance: 394

P. Hrehorčák (ES) 02:13; M. Kolena (PP) 12:35; J. Blaško (PP) 23:00; T. Palecek (ES) 30:02; M. Kolena (ES) 59:23 / Goals / 00:18 (ES) F. Tiffels; 23:35 (ES) S. Ziegler; 24:02 (ES) B. Zientek; 32:28 (ES) J. Koslowski; 33:02 (ES) M. Eberhardt; 40:41 (ES) M. Kurth; 45:55 (ES) M. Eberhardt; 59:39 (ES) J. Koslowski

==== 7th place game ====
January 3, 2011	Czech Republic	4–5	Finland	MTS Iceplex, Winnipeg

V. Tomeček (ES) 07:39; J. Schleiss (ES) 07:56; D. Volek (ES) 29:33; M. Zadražil (PP) 42:02 / Goals / 01:42 (ES) R. Kulmala; 39:35 (PP) R. Kulmala; 42:27 (ES) T. Teräväinen; 51:17 (SH) A. Lehkonen; 54:34 (ES) K. Torniainen

==== 5th place game ====
January 3, 2011	Canada West	1–2	Canada Atlantic	PCU Centre, Portage la Prairie; Attendance: 888

B. Leipsic (ES) 54:19 / Goals / 21:31 (ES) D. Oliver-Dares; 52:06 (ES) T. Burke

==== Bronze medal game ====
January 4, 2011	Canada Quebec	4–5 (OT)	Canada Pacific	MTS Centre, Winnipeg

L. Cimapini (ES) 1920; D. Poulin (PP) 25:44; F. Girard (ES) 41:54; D. Poulin (PP) 52:54 / Goals / 16:54 (PP2) S. Hodges; 46:23 (SH) R. Trzonkowski; 49:35 (ES) M. Winther; 56:31 (ES) H. Shinkaruk; 61:34 (ES) B. Magee

==== Gold medal game ====
January 4, 2011	Canada Ontario	5–3	United States	MTS Centre, Winnipeg; Attendance: 12,060

K. Rychel (ES) 04:39; S. Monahan (ES) 09:34; B. Gaunce (ES) 12:48; S. Monahan (ES) 47:13; M. Campagna (PS) 55:58 / Goals / 09:06 (ES) N. Olsson; 30:54 (ES) M. Koules; 41:07 (SH) S. Jones

== Scoring leaders ==
Player	Country	GP	G	A	Pts	PIM
Matt Dumba	Canada Pacific	6	0	12	12	2
Charles Hudon	Canada Quebec	6	5	6	11	8
Henrik Samuelsson	United States	6	6	4	10	10
Hunter Shinkaruk	Canada Pacific	6	5	4	9	2
Andrew Ryan	Canada Atlantic	5	2	7	9	6
Jacob Trouba	United States	6	2	7	9	12
Nathan MacKinnon	Canada Atlantic	5	5	3	8	0
Miles Koules	United States	6	4	4	8	4
Troy Bourke	Canada Pacific	6	3	5	8	14
Mike Matheson	Canada Quebec	6	2	6	8	10

== Goaltending leaders ==
(Minimum 60 minutes played)

Player	Country	MINS	GA	Sv%	GAA	SO
Andy Desautels	Canada West	60:00	1	.966	1.00	0
Daniel Altshuller	Canada Ontario	301:52	7	.947	1.39	2
Oskari Setänen	Finland	178:44	11	.910	3.69	1
Janne Juvonen	Finland	60:00	4	.907	4.00	0
Marek Lanhamer	Czech Republic	171:18	8	.900	2.80	0

== Final standings ==
	Team
1st place, gold medalist(s)	Canada Ontario
2nd place, silver medalist(s)	United States
3rd place, bronze medalist(s)	Canada Pacific
4	Canada Quebec
5	Canada Atlantic
6	Canada West
7	Finland
8	Czech Republic
9	Germany
10	Slovakia

== Tournament All-Star Team ==
- Goaltender: (Canada) Ontario Daniel Altshuller
- Defencemen: (United States) Seth Jones, (Canada) West Derrick Pouliot
- Forwards: (Canada) Ontario Andreas Athanasiou, (United States) Nicolas Kerdiles, (Canada) Pacific Hunter Shinkaruk

== See also ==
World U-17 Hockey Challenge

- 2011 IIHF World U18 Championships
- 2011 World Junior Ice Hockey Championships
