= Brendan Gaunce =

Canadian ice hockey player (born 1994)

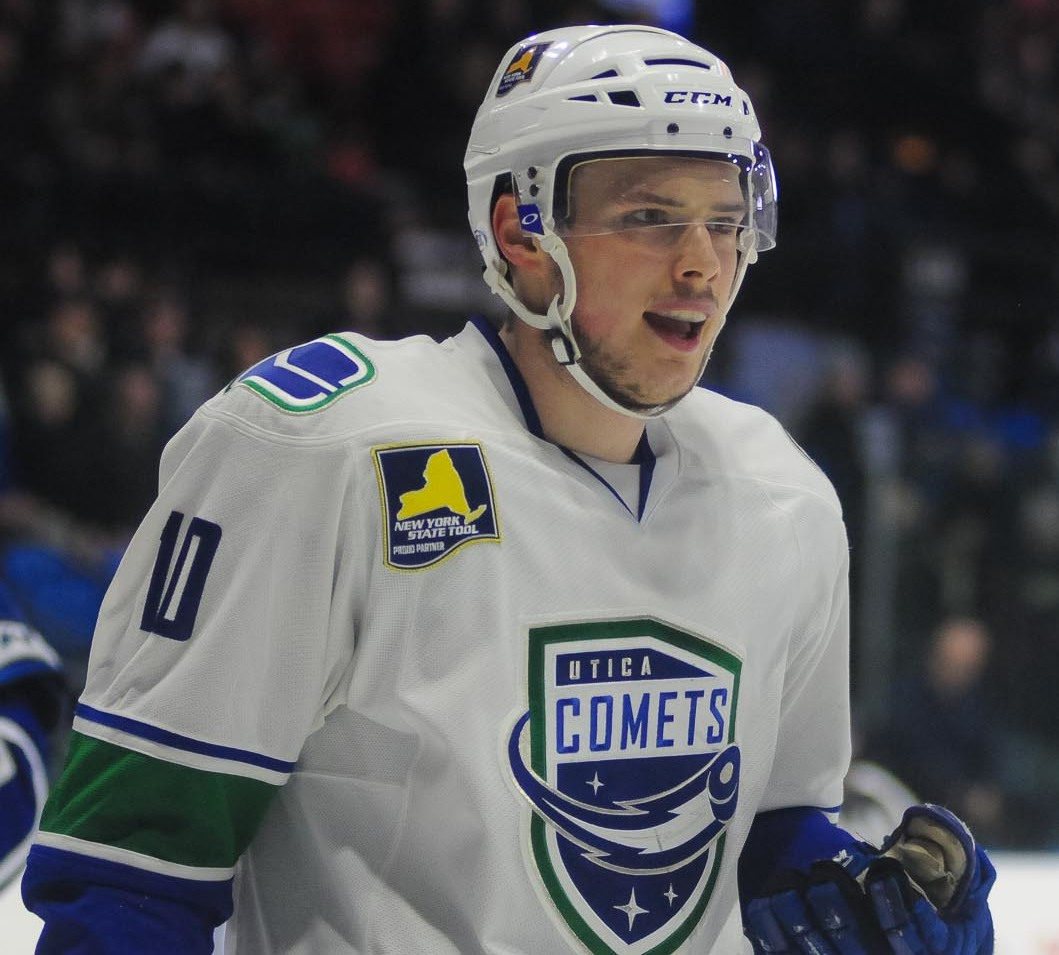
- Gaunce with the Utica Comets in 2015
- Born: March 25, 1994 (age 32) Sudbury, Ontario, Canada
- Height: 6 ft 2 in (188 cm)
- Weight: 217 lb (98 kg; 15 st 7 lb)
- Position: Forward
- Shoots: Left
- NHL team (P) Cur. team Former teams: Boston Bruins; Providence Bruins (AHL); Vancouver Canucks; Växjö Lakers; Columbus Blue Jackets; Minnesota Wild
- NHL draft: 26th overall, 2012; Vancouver Canucks
- Playing career: 2014–present

Brendan Gaunce (born March 25, 1994) is a Canadian professional ice hockey player who is a forward for the Providence Bruins of the American Hockey League (AHL) while under contract to the Boston Bruins of the National Hockey League (NHL). He was drafted 26th overall in the 2012 NHL entry draft by the Vancouver Canucks.

Gaunce has represented Canada twice. He won a gold medal at the 2011 Ivan Hlinka Memorial Tournament and a bronze at the 2012 IIHF World U18 Championships. He also represented Ontario at the 2011 World U-17 Hockey Challenge where he won a gold medal.

== Early life ==
Brendan was born to Stephen and Julie Gaunce in Sudbury, Ontario, but grew up in Markham, Ontario. He has two siblings; a brother and a sister. His older brother, Cameron, was drafted in the second round of the 2008 NHL entry draft by the Colorado Avalanche, and currently plays with the Ontario Reign in the AHL. Gaunce attended Markham District High School where he played on their ice hockey team registering 4 goals and 21 points in 17 games. Despite playing much of the season on defence, he was named to the Toronto Star High School Hockey All-Star First Team. He also captained the Markham Waxers Minor Midget team, scoring 55 goals and 148 points in 86 games in 2009–10.

== Playing career ==
=== Junior ===
The highest scoring minor midget player in Ontario in 2010, Gaunce was taken second in the OHL Priority Draft after Alex Galchenyuk by the Belleville Bulls of the Ontario Hockey League (OHL). Gaunce made his major junior debut in the 2010–11 OHL season and in his second OHL game recorded a four assist game in a 7–4 win over the Peterborough Petes. In the following game, Gaunce scored his first career OHL goal. He had a second 4-point game and added a 5-game point streak, finishing the season with 11 goals and 36 points, 13th in OHL rookie scoring.

At the beginning of his second season, Gaunce was named an alternate captain for the Bulls. During the season he earned the OHL Player of the Week award. He scored five goals and added an assist in three Belleville wins for the week ending November 27. Gaunce finished the season as a point a game player registering 28 goals and 40 assists in 68 games. At the end of the season Gaunce was Belleville's nominee for the Bobby Smith Trophy as scholastic player of the year, but lost out to Adam Pelech. Before the 2012 NHL entry draft, Gaunce was ranked 13th among North American skaters by the NHL's scouting department, and the top-ranked Canadian forward. Projected to be a mid first round pick, he fell to 26th when he was selected by the Vancouver Canucks. Canucks' general manager Mike Gillis stated that going into the draft they had targeted Gaunce and if he had not been available Vancouver would have traded down to add extra picks. On November 26, 2013, Brendan Gaunce was traded from the Belleville Bulls to the Erie Otters.

=== Professional ===
Gaunce played the entire 2014–15 season for the Canucks' American Hockey League (AHL) affiliate, the Utica Comets. Gaunce was a late cut from the Canucks' 2015 training camp and was again reassigned to Utica to start the season. He was recalled by the Canucks on October 28, 2015.

On October 29, 2015, Gaunce made his NHL debut with the Canucks in a game against the Dallas Stars in a 4–3 overtime loss. The next day, Gaunce scored his first NHL goal against Anders Lindback of the Arizona Coyotes in a 4–3 Canucks win. He was reassigned to Utica on November 5. On March 1, 2016, Gaunce was again recalled by the Vancouver Canucks. He played in the remainder of the Canucks' games that season before returning to the Comets to finish the season.

At the start of the 2016–17 season, Gaunce made the Canucks' roster out of training camp for the first time in his career. He earned his first career assist on October 16, 2016; assisting on a Ben Hutton goal in a 4–3 overtime win against the Carolina Hurricanes.

On August 9, 2017, the Canucks re-signed Gaunce to a two-year, $1.5 million contract worth $750,000 annually. Gaunce broke his foot in February and was set to be out for 2–4 weeks.

After five seasons within the Canucks organization, Gaunce left as a free agent after he was not tendered a qualifying offer. On July 1, 2019, Gaunce was signed to a one-year, two-way deal with the Boston Bruins worth $700,000. In the 2019–20 season, Gaunce only played one game for the Bruins recording an assist. Gaunce played 52 games in the AHL for the Providence Bruins recording 18 goals and 19 assists.

After receiving no interest from NHL clubs, on January 2, 2021, Gaunce signed with the Växjö Lakers of the Swedish Hockey League with the intent of joining the club to finish the 2020–21 season. Gaunce quickly transitioned to the larger European ice, recording 5 goals and 12 points and a +10 plus/minus rating in 18 contests. He added 7 points in 12 playoff games to help the club capture the SHL Championship.

As a free agent, Gaunce returned to North America in the off-season, securing a one-year, two-way contract with the Columbus Blue Jackets on July 30, 2021.

Gaunce decided to re-up with the Blue Jackets by signing a two-year, $1.525 million contract on June 18, 2022.

After three seasons within the Blue Jackets organization, Gaunce left as a free agent and was signed to a two-year, two-way contract with the Minnesota Wild on July 1, 2024. One year into his tenure with the Wild, however, Gaunce was traded back to Columbus in exchange for Cameron Butler.

On July 1, 2026, Gaunce signed as a free agent to a two-year, $1.75 million contract with the Boston Bruins, returning for his second stint with the club.

== International play ==
Medal record

Men's ice hockey

Representing Canada

IIHF World U18 Championship
Bronze medal – third place	2012 Czech Republic	

Ivan Hlinka Memorial Tournament
Gold medal – first place	2011 Slovakia & Czech Republic	

Representing Ontario

World U-17 Hockey Challenge
Gold medal – first place	2011 Manitoba	

Gaunce made his international debut at the 2011 World U-17 Hockey Challenge representing team Ontario. After winning their first two games Team Ontario was leading Team West 3–2 early in the third when Gaunce assisted on an insurance goal by Matia Marcantuoni. Ontario eventually won the game 4–3 to remain unbeaten and clinch a spot in the semi-final. In Ontario's final preliminary game Gaunce scored two second period goals helping Ontario to the 4–2 win over team Pacific. Gaunce was named player of the game for Ontario. Ontario defeated Quebec 2–1 in overtime to advance to the gold medal game. In the gold medal game Gaunce scored the third goal in a 5–3 victory.

Later in the year Gaunce represented Canada at the 2011 Ivan Hlinka Memorial Tournament. Team Canada lost its opening game to Sweden 5–1, but finished the preliminary round with a 2–1 record and received a spot in the semi-finals. In the semi-final game Gaunce assisted on Team Canada's third goal in a 5–0 victory of the Russians. Canada re-matched Sweden in the Final with Gaunce scoring early in the third to give the Canadians a two-goal advantage then assisting on another goal mid-way through the period. Canada defeated Sweden 4–1 winning the gold medal, Canada's fourth straight at the tournament.

Gaunce again played for Team Canada the following year at the 2012 IIHF World U18 Championships. After Canada started the tournament with split decisions Gaunce scored two first period goals and added an assist in a 6–2 win over the Czech Republic. For his performance Gaunce was named player of the game for Team Canada. Canada lost its next game finishing the preliminary round with a 2–2–0 record, third place in their pool. Canada qualified for the quarterfinals where they defeated the Russians 4–2. In the Semi-final game Canada lost to the United States 2–1. Despite not registering a point Gaunce was named player of the game for the Canadians. With the loss Canada faced Finland in the bronze medal game. In the first period Gaunce was hooked by Ville Pokka resulting in a penalty shot opportunity. Gaunce failed to score on the penalty shot, but registered a shorthanded goal in the second period. Canada defeated Finland 5–4 capturing the bronze medal.

== Career statistics ==
=== Regular season and playoffs ===
			Regular season					Playoffs
Season	Team	League	GP	G	A	Pts	PIM	GP	G	A	Pts	PIM
2009–10	Markham Waxers AAA	ETA U16	86	55	93	148	54	—	—	—	—	—
2010–11	Belleville Bulls	OHL	65	11	25	36	40	4	0	0	0	4
2011–12	Belleville Bulls	OHL	68	28	40	68	68	6	1	2	3	2
2012–13	Belleville Bulls	OHL	60	33	27	60	44	17	8	14	22	10
2013–14	Belleville Bulls	OHL	22	10	16	26	27	—	—	—	—	—
2013–14	Erie Otters	OHL	43	21	25	46	32	14	5	11	16	16
2014–15	Utica Comets	AHL	74	11	18	29	31	21	4	5	9	12
2015–16	Utica Comets	AHL	46	17	21	38	16	4	0	0	0	4
2015–16	Vancouver Canucks	NHL	20	1	0	1	2	—	—	—	—	—
2016–17	Vancouver Canucks	NHL	57	0	5	5	33	—	—	—	—	—
2016–17	Utica Comets	AHL	4	2	1	3	2	—	—	—	—	—
2017–18	Utica Comets	AHL	5	2	1	3	0	—	—	—	—	—
2017–18	Vancouver Canucks	NHL	37	4	2	6	10	—	—	—	—	—
2018–19	Utica Comets	AHL	60	16	22	38	54	—	—	—	—	—
2018–19	Vancouver Canucks	NHL	3	1	2	3	0	—	—	—	—	—
2019–20	Providence Bruins	AHL	52	18	19	37	34	—	—	—	—	—
2019–20	Boston Bruins	NHL	1	0	1	1	2	—	—	—	—	—
2020–21	Växjö Lakers	SHL	18	5	7	12	18	12	3	4	7	29
2021–22	Cleveland Monsters	AHL	39	16	12	28	28	—	—	—	—	—
2021–22	Columbus Blue Jackets	NHL	30	5	2	7	12	—	—	—	—	—
2022–23	Cleveland Monsters	AHL	17	7	11	18	18	—	—	—	—	—
2022–23	Columbus Blue Jackets	NHL	5	0	1	1	2	—	—	—	—	—
2023–24	Cleveland Monsters	AHL	46	19	20	39	37	6	3	2	5	6
2023–24	Columbus Blue Jackets	NHL	24	2	2	4	6	—	—	—	—	—
2024–25	Iowa Wild	AHL	39	15	14	29	20	—	—	—	—	—
2024–25	Minnesota Wild	NHL	12	0	1	1	4	—	—	—	—	—
2025–26	Cleveland Monsters	AHL	44	16	20	36	18	9	0	2	2	4
2025–26	Columbus Blue Jackets	NHL	25	2	4	6	12	—	—	—	—	—
NHL totals			214	15	20	35	83	—	—	—	—	—

=== International ===
Year	Team	Event	Result	GP	G	A	Pts	PIM
2011	Canada Ontario	U17	1st place, gold medalist(s)	6	3	1	4	18
2011	Canada	IH18	1st place, gold medalist(s)	5	1	3	4	2
2012	Canada	U18	3rd place, bronze medalist(s)	7	3	1	4	8
Junior totals				18	7	5	12	28

== Awards and honours ==
Award	Year
CHL
CHL/NHL Top Prospects Game	2012
SHL
Le Mat Trophy (Växjö Lakers)	2021

Awards and achievements
Preceded by Nicklas Jensen	Vancouver Canucks first-round draft pick 2012	Succeeded by Bo Horvat
