= Andreas Štrauch =

Slovak professional ice hockey player (born 1994)

- Born: 22 February 1994 (age 32) Poprad, Slovakia
- Height: 6 ft 0 in (183 cm)
- Weight: 190 lb (86 kg; 13 st 8 lb)
- Position: Right wing
- Shoots: Right
- Slovak team Former teams: HC '05 Banská Bystrica; HK Poprad; HK Orange 20; HC Prešov; HC Nové Zámky; HKM Zvolen; HK Dukla Michalovce; MHk 32 Liptovský Mikuláš; HK Spišská Nová Ves
- NHL draft: Undrafted
- Playing career: 2011–present

Andreas Štrauch (born 22 February 1994) is a Slovak professional ice hockey player who currently playing for HC '05 Banská Bystrica of the Slovak Extraliga.

== Career statistics ==
=== Regular season and playoffs ===
			Regular season					Playoffs
Season	Team	League	GP	G	A	Pts	PIM	GP	G	A	Pts	PIM
2010–11	HK Poprad	Slovak-Jr.	3	1	2	3	0	—	—	—	—	—
2011–12	HK Poprad	Slovak-Jr.	25	14	10	24	12	—	—	—	—	—
2011–12	HK Orange 20	Slovak.1	2	0	0	0	2	—	—	—	—	—
2012–13	Patriot Budapest	MHL	0	0	0	0	0	—	—	—	—	—
2013–14	HK Poprad	Slovak-Jr.	33	22	42	64	46	—	—	—	—	—
2013–14	HK Poprad	Slovak	16	1	0	1	0	—	—	—	—	—
2014–15	HK Poprad	Slovak-Jr.	21	13	19	32	44	1	1	0	1	0
2014–15	HK Poprad	Slovak	38	1	4	5	4	8	1	2	3	0
2014–15	HC Prešov	Slovak.1	2	0	1	1	0	—	—	—	—	—
2015–16	HK Poprad	Slovak	50	9	10	19	6	5	0	0	0	2
2016–17	HK Poprad	Slovak	45	7	17	24	12	4	1	1	2	0
2017–18	HK Poprad	Slovak	47	15	17	32	10	3	0	0	0	2
2018–19	HC Nové Zámky	Slovak	55	12	16	28	8	4	1	0	1	0
2018–19	HC Nové Zámky B	Slovak.1	2	0	1	1	0	—	—	—	—	—
2019–20	HK Poprad	Slovak	11	0	3	3	6	—	—	—	—	—
2019–20	HKM Zvolen	Slovak	32	6	9	15	6	—	—	—	—	—
2019–20	HK Dukla Michalovce	Slovak	7	3	3	6	2	—	—	—	—	—
2020–21	MHk 32 Liptovský Mikuláš	Slovak	46	15	17	32	30	—	—	—	—	—
2021–22	HK Spišská Nová Ves	Slovak	47	15	11	26	10	3	0	0	0	0
2022–23	HK Spišská Nová Ves	Slovak	14	6	3	9	2	—	—	—	—	—
2022–23	MHk 32 Liptovský Mikuláš	Slovak	30	3	6	9	8	—	—	—	—	—
Slovak totals			438	93	116	209	104	27	3	3	6	4

=== International ===
Year	Team	Event	Result	GP	G	A	Pts	PIM
2011	Slovakia	U17	10th	5	2	1	3	0
2011	Slovakia	IH18	8th	4	1	2	3	0
Junior totals				9	3	3	6	0
