= Rasmus Ristolainen =

Finnish ice hockey player (born 1994)

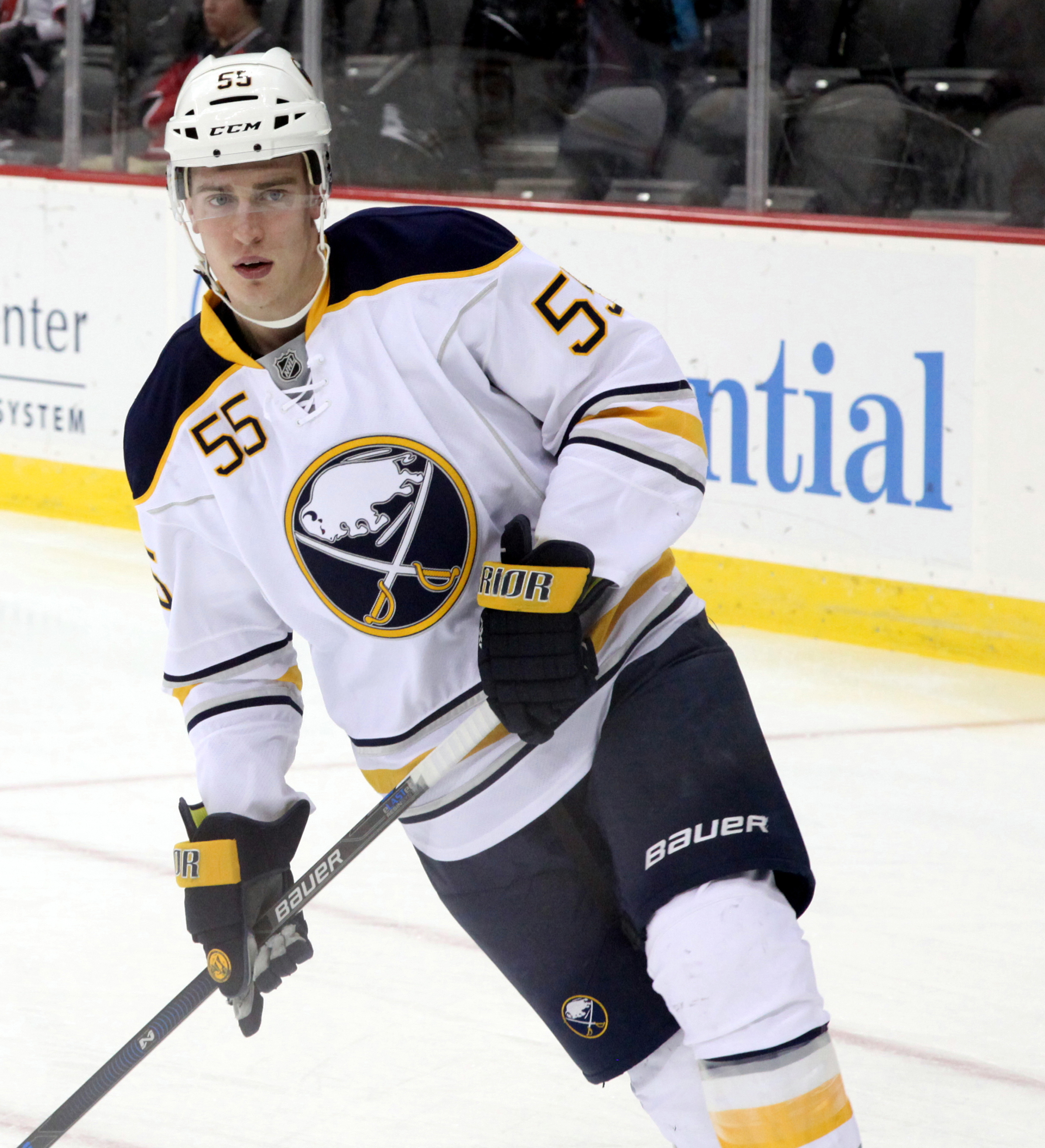
- Ristolainen with the Buffalo Sabres in 2016
- Born: 27 October 1994 (age 31) Turku, Finland
- Height: 6 ft 4 in (193 cm)
- Weight: 215 lb (98 kg; 15 st 5 lb)
- Position: Defence
- Shoots: Right
- NHL team Former teams: Philadelphia Flyers; TPS; Buffalo Sabres
- National team: Finland
- NHL draft: 8th overall, 2013; Buffalo Sabres
- Playing career: 2011–present

Rasmus Ristolainen (born 27 October 1994) is a Finnish professional ice hockey player who is a defenceman for the Philadelphia Flyers of the National Hockey League (NHL). He was selected eighth overall by the Buffalo Sabres in the 2013 NHL entry draft.

== Playing career ==
Ristolainen made his NHL debut with the Buffalo Sabres on the opening night of the 2013–14 season, on 2 October 2013, against the Detroit Red Wings. He scored his first career NHL goal on 25 October, in a 3–1 win over the Florida Panthers. He scored his first NHL hat-trick on 10 December 2015, in a 4–3 loss against the Calgary Flames. In doing so, he became the first Sabres' defenceman to score a hat-trick since Hockey Hall of Famer Phil Housley did so in the 1987–88 season.

On 21 March 2017, Ristolainen delivered a check to Pittsburgh Penguins forward Jake Guentzel. Guentzel suffered a concussion on the play, and Ristolainen was given a three-game suspension for interference by the league.

On 23 July 2021, Ristolainen was traded by the Sabres to the Philadelphia Flyers in exchange for Robert Hägg, a 2021 first-round pick and a 2023 second-round pick. On 10 March 2022, he signed a five-year contract extension with the Flyers.

== International play ==
Medal record

Ice hockey

Representing Finland

Olympic Games
Bronze medal – third place	2026 Milano Cortina	

World Junior Championships
Gold medal – first place	2014 Malmö	

On 5 January 2014, Ristolainen scored the overtime winner in the final of the 2014 World Junior Ice Hockey Championships against previously undefeated Sweden, giving Finland the gold medal.

Ristolainen represented Finland at the 2026 Winter Olympics and won a bronze medal.

== Career statistics ==
=== Regular season and playoffs ===
			Regular season					Playoffs
Season	Team	League	GP	G	A	Pts	PIM	GP	G	A	Pts	PIM
2009–10	TPS	FIN U18	24	3	4	7	12	3	1	0	1	4
2009–10	TPS	FIN U20	5	1	1	2	0	—	—	—	—	—
2010–11	TPS	FIN U18	2	1	2	3	0	13	5	3	8	8
2010–11	TPS	FIN U20	27	0	12	12	30	—	—	—	—	—
2010–11	TPS	SM-l	1	0	0	0	0	—	—	—	—	—
2011–12	TPS	FIN U20	8	0	4	4	6	—	—	—	—	—
2011–12	TPS	SM-l	40	3	5	8	78	2	0	0	0	0
2012–13	TPS	SM-l	52	3	12	15	32	—	—	—	—	—
2012–13	TPS	FIN U20	—	—	—	—	—	5	2	1	3	2
2013–14	Rochester Americans	AHL	34	6	14	20	22	5	0	2	2	2
2013–14	Buffalo Sabres	NHL	34	2	2	4	6	—	—	—	—	—
2014–15	Buffalo Sabres	NHL	78	8	12	20	26	—	—	—	—	—
2015–16	Buffalo Sabres	NHL	82	9	32	41	33	—	—	—	—	—
2016–17	Buffalo Sabres	NHL	79	6	39	45	58	—	—	—	—	—
2017–18	Buffalo Sabres	NHL	73	6	35	41	48	—	—	—	—	—
2018–19	Buffalo Sabres	NHL	78	5	38	43	38	—	—	—	—	—
2019–20	Buffalo Sabres	NHL	69	6	27	33	46	—	—	—	—	—
2020–21	Buffalo Sabres	NHL	49	4	14	18	36	—	—	—	—	—
2021–22	Philadelphia Flyers	NHL	66	2	14	16	38	—	—	—	—	—
2022–23	Philadelphia Flyers	NHL	74	3	17	20	32	—	—	—	—	—
2023–24	Philadelphia Flyers	NHL	31	1	3	4	8	—	—	—	—	—
2024–25	Philadelphia Flyers	NHL	63	4	15	19	14	—	—	—	—	—
2025–26	Philadelphia Flyers	NHL	44	1	13	14	16	10	1	4	5	20
Liiga totals			93	6	17	23	110	2	0	0	0	0
NHL totals			820	57	261	318	399	10	1	4	5	20

=== International ===
Year	Team	Event	Result	GP	G	A	Pts	PIM
2010	Finland	U17	10th	5	0	2	2	4
2011	Finland	U17	7th	5	1	0	1	4
2011	Finland	IH18	4th	5	1	2	3	10
2012	Finland	WJC	4th	7	0	3	3	0
2012	Finland	WJC18	4th	7	2	1	3	10
2013	Finland	WJC	7th	6	2	4	6	20
2014	Finland	WJC	1st place, gold medalist(s)	5	3	0	3	8
2016	Finland	WCH	8th	3	0	0	0	0
2026	Finland	OG	3rd place, bronze medalist(s)	6	0	3	3	2
Junior totals				40	9	12	21	56
Senior totals				9	0	3	3	2

Awards and achievements
Preceded by Zemgus Girgensons	Buffalo Sabres first-round draft pick 2013	Succeeded by Nikita Zadorov
