= Ville Pokka =

Finnish ice hockey player (born 1994)

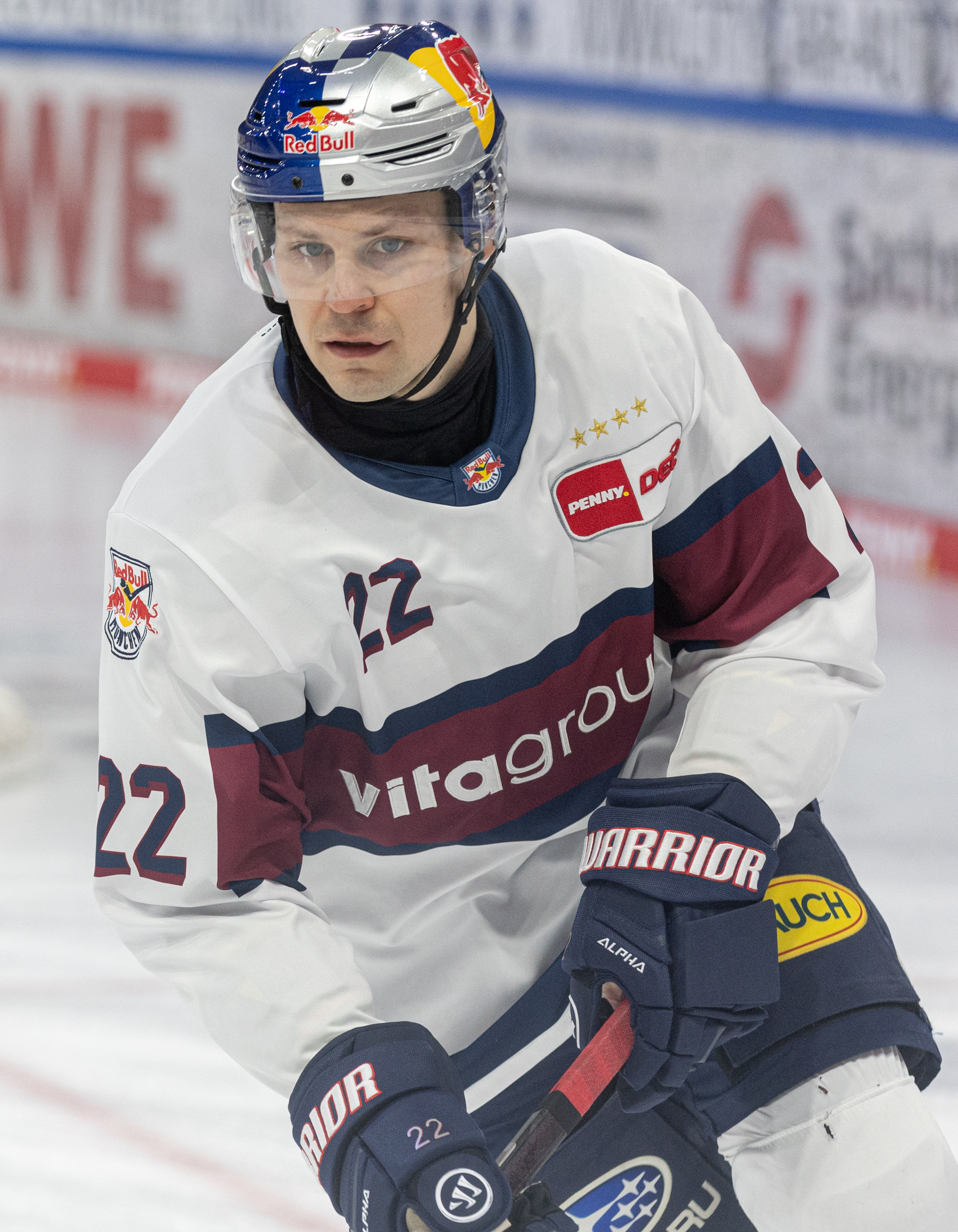
- Pokka in 2025
- Born: 3 June 1994 (age 32) Tornio, Finland
- Height: 6 ft 0 in (183 cm)
- Weight: 187 lb (85 kg; 13 st 5 lb)
- Position: Defence
- Shoots: Right
- DEL team Former teams: EHC München; Oulun Kärpät; Rockford IceHogs; Belleville Senators; Avangard Omsk; Färjestad BK; EHC Biel-Bienne; SC Bern
- National team: Finland
- NHL draft: 34th overall, 2012; New York Islanders
- Playing career: 2010–present

Ville Pokka (born 3 June 1994) is a Finnish professional ice hockey defenseman who plays for EHC Red Bull München of the Deutsche Eishockey Liga (DEL).

== Playing career ==
Pokka played with Kärpät in the SM-Liiga during the 2010–11 season. He was drafted 23rd overall by Avangard Omsk in the 2012 KHL Junior Draft and 34th overall by the New York Islanders in the 2012 NHL entry draft.

On 28 May 2014, Pokka was signed to a three-year entry-level contract with the Islanders.

Prior to the 2014–15 season, on 4 October 2014, Pokka was traded, along with T. J. Brennan and Anders Nilsson by the Islanders to the Chicago Blackhawks in exchange for Nick Leddy and Kent Simpson. He was then directly assigned to the Blackhawks' American Hockey League (AHL) affiliate, the Rockford IceHogs.

After three seasons with the organization (all of which were spent with the IceHogs), the Blackhawks re-signed Pokka to a one-year, $650,000 contract extension on 27 June 2017.

In the 2017–18 season, Pokka was reassigned to the IceHogs. On 13 December 2017, Pokka was recalled by the Blackhawks. However, remained a healthy scratch before returning to Rockford on 18 December. After posting 22 points in 46 games, Pokka was traded by the Blackhawks to the Ottawa Senators in exchange for Chris DiDomenico on 15 February 2018. Pokka joined the Senators AHL affiliate, the Belleville Senators, and continued to provide offense from the blueline with 3 goals and 11 points in 23 games to end the season.

As an impending restricted free agent with the Senators, Pokka opted to leave North America by agreeing to a one-year contract with his Russian KHL draft club, Avangard Omsk, on 8 May 2018.

In March 2022, Pokka left Avangard Omsk during the playoffs due to the Russian invasion of Ukraine. As a free agent in the off-season, Pokka signed a one-year contract in moving to Sweden with Färjestad BK of the SHL, on 5 June 2022.

In 2023, he signed with EHC Biel-Bienne of the NL before being loaned to SC Bern in December. In January 2024, he terminated his deal with Biel-Bienne and signed with Bern for the rest of the year.

== Career statistics ==
=== Regular season and playoffs ===
			Regular season					Playoffs
Season	Team	League	GP	G	A	Pts	PIM	GP	G	A	Pts	PIM
2009–10	Kärpät	FIN U18	20	0	5	5	10	5	0	0	0	4
2010–11	Kärpät	FIN U18	3	0	2	2	0	9	0	7	7	8
2010–11	Kärpät	FIN U20	32	6	15	21	16	—	—	—	—	—
2010–11	Kärpät	SM-l	2	0	0	0	2	—	—	—	—	—
2010–11	Kiekko–Laser	Mestis	3	0	3	3	0	—	—	—	—	—
2011–12	Kärpät	FIN U20	4	3	4	7	2	—	—	—	—	—
2011–12	Kärpät	SM-l	35	0	3	3	12	9	0	3	3	2
2012–13	Kärpät	FIN U20	3	0	0	0	4	—	—	—	—	—
2012–13	Kärpät	SM-l	47	6	6	12	8	3	0	2	2	0
2013–14	Kärpät	Liiga	54	6	21	27	16	16	2	9	11	10
2014–15	Rockford IceHogs	AHL	68	8	22	30	16	8	0	3	3	0
2015–16	Rockford IceHogs	AHL	76	10	35	45	24	3	0	1	1	0
2016–17	Rockford IceHogs	AHL	76	6	24	30	35	—	—	—	—	—
2017–18	Rockford IceHogs	AHL	46	4	18	22	20	—	—	—	—	—
2017–18	Belleville Senators	AHL	23	3	8	11	8	—	—	—	—	—
2018–19	Avangard Omsk	KHL	61	7	10	17	8	19	2	1	3	6
2019–20	Avangard Omsk	KHL	62	1	12	13	18	6	1	1	2	0
2020–21	Avangard Omsk	KHL	31	4	9	13	8	24	1	4	5	10
2021–22	Avangard Omsk	KHL	39	3	8	11	16	2	0	1	1	2
2022–23	Färjestad BK	SHL	49	4	18	22	45	—	—	—	—	—
2023–24	EHC Biel–Bienne	NL	18	0	4	4	4	—	—	—	—	—
2023–24	SC Bern	NL	16	0	6	6	6	5	0	0	0	2
2024–25	Kärpät	Liiga	23	2	4	6	4	—	—	—	—	—
2025–26	EHC München	DEL	52	6	19	25	12	11	1	7	8	6
Liiga totals			161	14	34	48	42	28	2	14	16	12
KHL totals			193	15	39	54	50	51	4	7	11	18

Medal record

Representing Finland

Ice hockey

Olympic Games
Gold medal – first place	2022 Beijing	

World Championships
Gold medal – first place	2022 Finland	
Silver medal – second place	2016 Russia	
Silver medal – second place	2021 Latvia	

World Junior Championships
Gold medal – first place	2014 Malmö	

=== International ===
Year	Team	Event	Result	GP	G	A	Pts	PIM
2011	Finland	U17	7th	5	1	0	1	4
2011	Finland	WJC18	5th	6	0	0	0	2
2011	Finland	IH18	4th	5	2	3	5	2
2012	Finland	WJC	4th	7	1	3	4	4
2012	Finland	WJC18	4th	7	1	5	6	4
2013	Finland	WJC	7th	6	2	4	6	2
2014	Finland	WJC	1st place, gold medalist(s)	7	1	3	4	4
2016	Finland	WC	2nd place, silver medalist(s)	10	0	2	2	0
2016	Finland	WCH	8th	3	0	0	0	0
2018	Finland	WC	5th	8	0	0	0	0
2021	Finland	WC	2nd place, silver medalist(s)	10	0	2	2	4
2022	Finland	OG	1st place, gold medalist(s)	6	1	2	3	0
2022	Finland	WC	1st place, gold medalist(s)	8	0	2	2	0
2023	Finland	WC	7th	8	1	1	2	0
Junior totals				43	8	18	26	22
Senior totals				53	2	9	11	4

== Awards and honors ==
Award	Year
Liiga
Matti Keinonen Trophy	2014
Kanada-malja (Oulun Kärpät)	2014
AHL
All-Rookie Team	2015
KHL
Gagarin Cup (Avangard Omsk)	2021
