= Hunter Shinkaruk =

Canadian ice hockey player (born 1994)

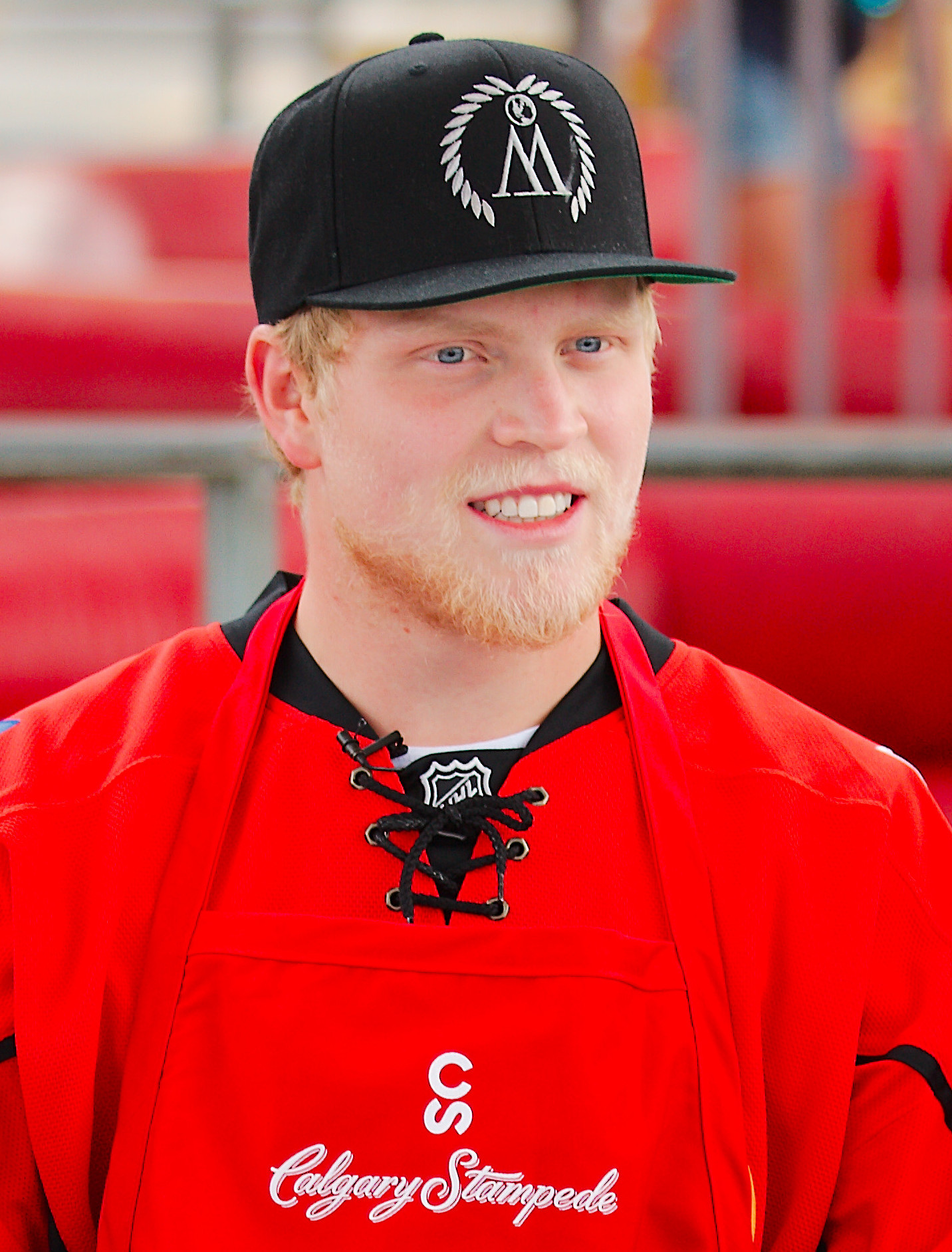
- Shinkaruk in 2016
- Born: October 13, 1994 (age 31) Calgary, Alberta, Canada
- Height: 5 ft 11 in (180 cm)
- Weight: 186 lb (84 kg; 13 st 4 lb)
- Position: Forward
- Shoots: Left
- team Former teams: Free agent Vancouver Canucks; Calgary Flames; Laval Rocket; Charlotte Checkers; Kunlun Red Star; Dinamo Riga; HV71; Neftekhimik Nizhnekamsk; Iserlohn Roosters; Cardiff Devils
- NHL draft: 24th overall, 2013; Vancouver Canucks
- Playing career: 2014–present

Hunter Shinkaruk (born October 13, 1994) is a Canadian professional ice hockey forward who is currently a free agent. He last played with the Elite Ice Hockey League (EIHL)'s Cardiff Devils. He was selected in the first round, 24th overall, by the Vancouver Canucks of the National Hockey League (NHL) in the 2013 NHL entry draft, and has also played for the Calgary Flames.

Shinkaruk played junior ice hockey with the Medicine Hat Tigers of the Western Hockey League (WHL) before turning professional with the Utica Comets of the American Hockey League (AHL) within the Vancouver Canucks organization.

== Playing career ==
=== Minor ===
Born in Calgary, Alberta, Shinkaruk played minor hockey for the Calgary Royals. After scoring 32 goals and 63 points over 27 games in his second year of major bantam, Shinkaruk was selected 14th overall by the Medicine Hat Tigers in the 2009 Western Hockey League (WHL) Bantam Draft. Advancing to the midget level the following season, Shinkaruk broke the tibia and fibula in his right leg, causing him to miss the entire 2009–10 campaign except for three games.

=== Junior ===
Following his rehabilitation, Shinkaruk joined the Tigers for his first junior season. He scored his first WHL goal in his fifth game, a 6–4 win against the Edmonton Oil Kings on October 16, 2010. Scoring 42 points (14 goals and 28 assists) over 63 games in 2010–11, he ranked 10th among league rookies. He added 9 points in 14 games as Medicine Hat advanced to the WHL semifinals.

In his second WHL season, Shinkaruk improved to a career-high 49 goals and 91 points in 66 games, ranking 12th in league scoring. Playing in 8 post-season games, he recorded 2 goals and 11 points. The following season, Shinkaruk was named team captain for the Tigers and went on to record 37 goals and 86 points in 64 games, ranking 14th among WHL scorers.

Playing in his draft-eligible year, Shinkaruk was ranked the sixth-best prospect among skaters playing in North America. He was selected 24th overall by the Vancouver Canucks in the 2013 NHL entry draft. Following his draft, Shinkaruk attended his first NHL training camp with the Canucks and was among the team's final cuts. Despite being on the roster after the team's final preseason game, the subsequent acquisitions of Jeremy Welsh and Zac Dalpe resulted in him being returned to junior.

Early in the 2013–14 season, Shinkaruk sustained a torn labrum in his hip, but played through it in hopes of competing in the 2014 World Junior Championships. After being cut from Team Canada's selection camp, Shinkaruk underwent hip surgery on January 7, 2014, ending his season. He had recorded 16 points in 18 games. In July 2014, news was revealed that Shinkaruk's hip was injured for much of his junior career and that he had simply delayed the healing process until his surgery in early 2014.

During his rehabilitation period, Shinkaruk made a conscious decision to address his strength concerns, appearing at the Canucks' 2014 training camp with much greater physical strength after reportedly gaining 15 lbs during that off-season.

=== Professional ===
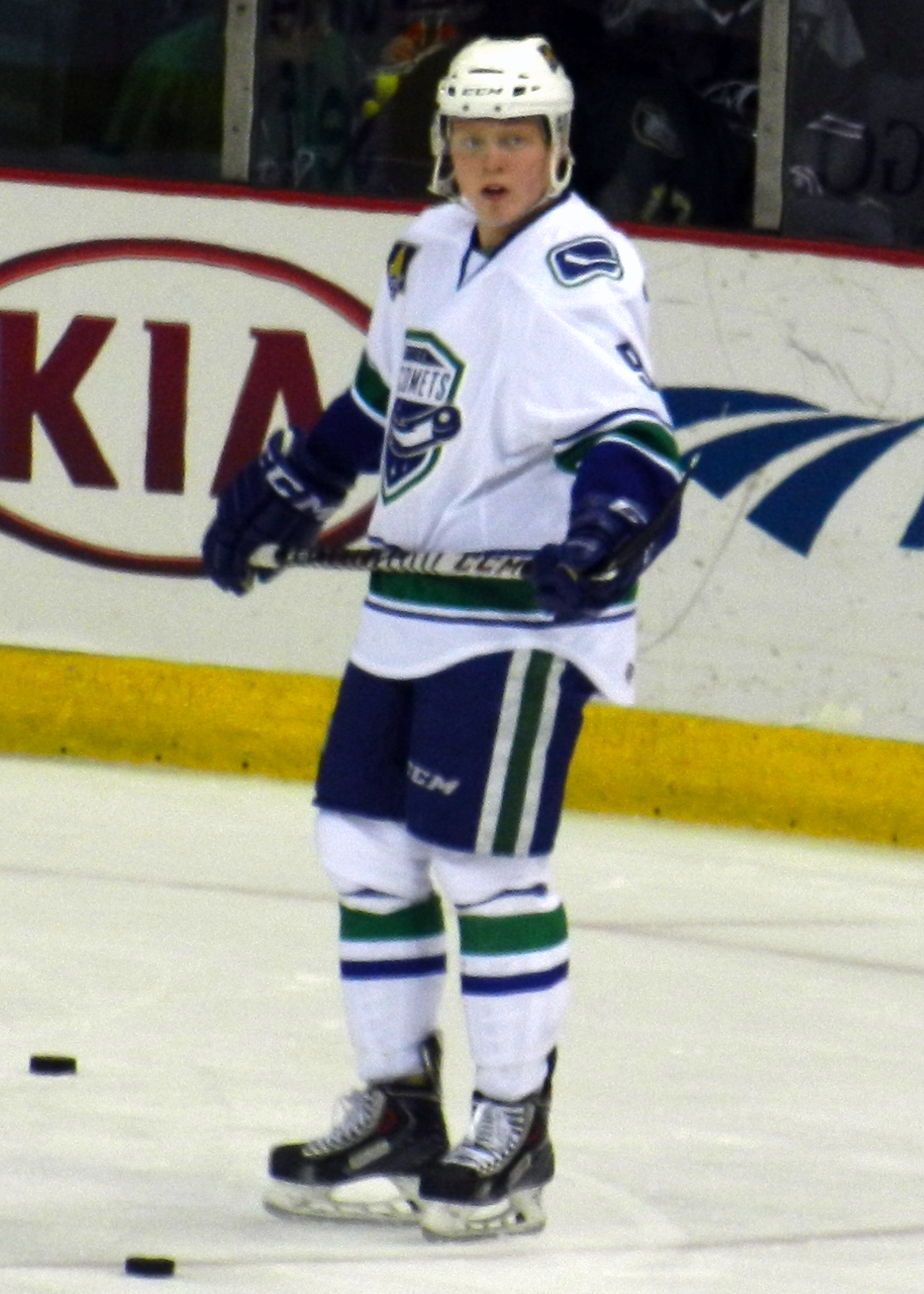
Shinkaruk with the Utica Comets in 2015

Shinkaruk made his on-ice return at the Canucks' Young Stars Tournament in September 2014 and was later assigned to the Canucks' American Hockey League (AHL) affiliate, the Utica Comets for the 2014–15 season. After a slow start, in which he scored six goals in his first 42 games, Shinkaruk finished his rookie season with nine goals in the last 16 games of the regular season. He then added four goals in 23 playoff games, as the Comets lost in the Calder Cup Finals.

After an impressive first 12 games in Utica in the 2015–16 season; which included 10 goals and two hat tricks, Shinkaruk was called up by the Canucks. He made his NHL debut on November 16, 2015 in a 4–3 overtime loss to the Montreal Canadiens. He was returned to the Comets the following day. Shinkaruk was leading the Comets offensively with 39 points in 45 games when he was traded by the Canucks to the Calgary Flames in exchange for Markus Granlund on February 22, 2016. He was immediately assigned to the Flames AHL affiliate, the Stockton Heat.

Shinkaruk made his debut with the Flames on March 28, 2016, against the Arizona Coyotes, in which he got his first NHL point. He scored his first NHL goal as a Calgary Flame against the Anaheim Ducks in a 5–4 loss on March 30, 2016.

On August 20, 2018, Shinkaruk was traded to the Montreal Canadiens in exchange for Kerby Rychel. As a restricted free agent, Shinkaruk immediately signed a one-year, two-way contract worth $650,000 at the NHL level. In the 2018–19 season, Shinkaruk was assigned by the Canadiens to the Laval Rocket for the year, posting just 5 goals and 10 points in 54 games.

As an impending restricted free agent, Shinkaruk was not tendered a qualifying offer by the Canadiens, releasing him as a free agent on June 25, 2019. Unable to attract an NHL contract, Shinkaruk agreed to a one-year AHL contract with reigning Calder Cup champions, the Charlotte Checkers, on July 18, 2019. In the 2019–20 season, Shinkaruk was slow to produce with the Checkers, collecting 7 points through 20 games, before opting to end his contract in the AHL to sign his first contract abroad with Chinese club, HC Kunlun Red Star of the Kontinental Hockey League (KHL) on December 23, 2019.

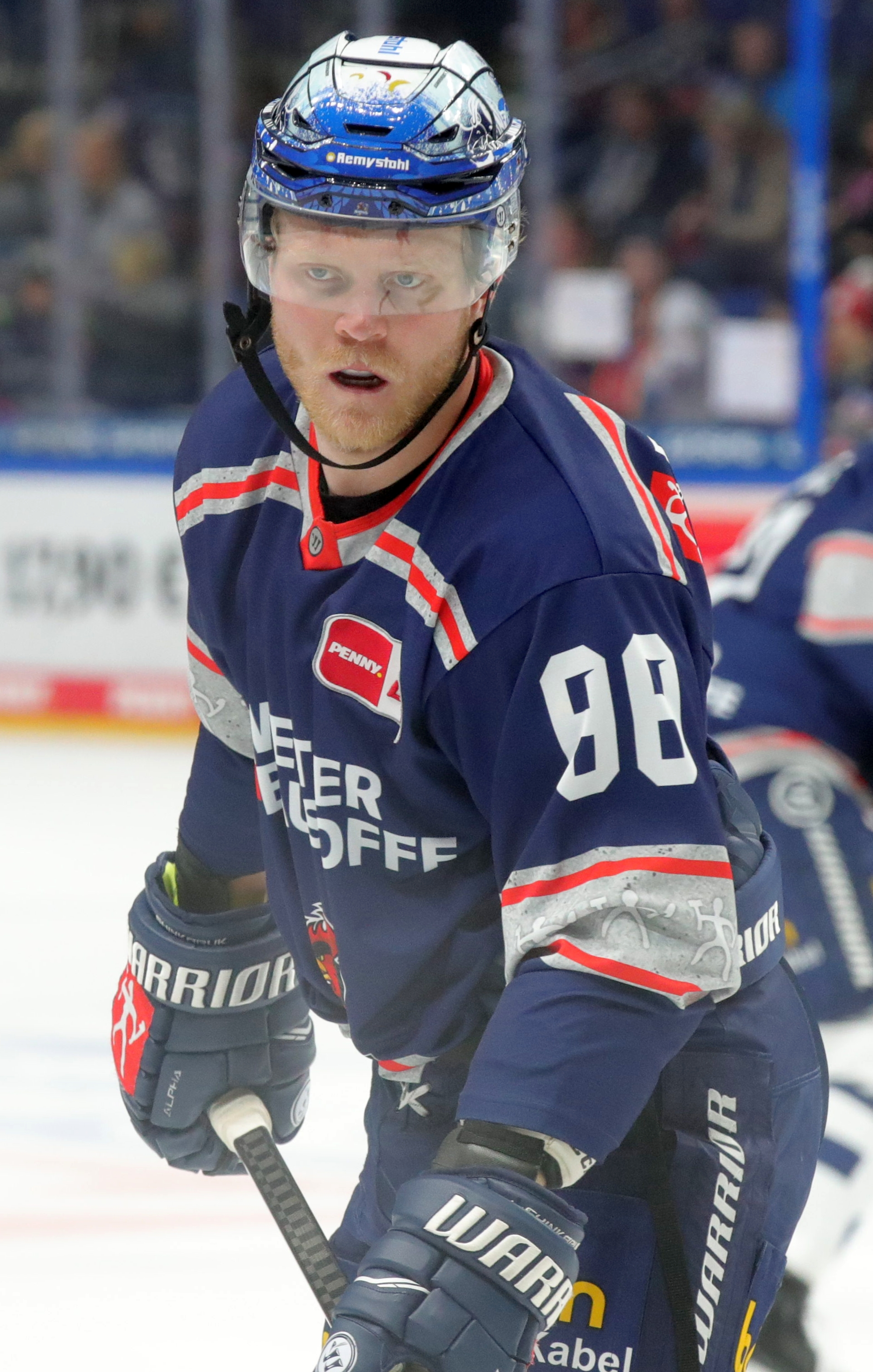
Shinkaruk in 2023 playing for Iserlohn Roosters

Shinkaruk played two seasons with Kunlun before leaving to sign as a free agent with Latvian-based KHL club, Dinamo Riga, on June 2, 2021.

In July 2024, Shinkaruk agreed terms to join UK EIHL side Cardiff Devils.

== International play ==
He played at the 2010 World U-17 Hockey Challenge and was rewarded for his stand-out performance by being named to the WHC's All-Tournament team.

Shinkaruk competed at the 2012 IIHF World U18 Championships where he won a Bronze Medal with Team Canada, scoring the winning goal in the overtime of the bronze medal game.

In December 2012, Shinkaruk received an invite to Team Canada's national junior selection camp for the 2013 World Junior Championships, but did not make the final roster. The next year, he received another invite. Playing with an injured hip, he was the team's final cut before the 2014 World Juniors.

== Career statistics ==
=== Regular season and playoffs ===
| | | | Regular season | | | | | Playoffs |
| Season | Team | League | GP | G | A | Pts | PIM | GP | G | A | Pts | PIM |
|---|---|---|---|---|---|---|---|---|---|---|---|---|
| 2010–11 | Medicine Hat Tigers | WHL | 63 | 14 | 28 | 42 | 24 | 14 | 4 | 5 | 9 | 0 |
| 2011–12 | Medicine Hat Tigers | WHL | 66 | 49 | 42 | 91 | 38 | 8 | 2 | 9 | 11 | 6 |
| 2012–13 | Medicine Hat Tigers | WHL | 64 | 37 | 49 | 86 | 44 | 8 | 3 | 3 | 6 | 8 |
| 2013–14 | Medicine Hat Tigers | WHL | 18 | 5 | 11 | 16 | 29 | — | — | — | — | — |
| 2014–15 | Utica Comets | AHL | 74 | 16 | 15 | 31 | 28 | 23 | 4 | 2 | 6 | 4 |
| 2015–16 | Utica Comets | AHL | 45 | 21 | 18 | 39 | 18 | — | — | — | — | — |
| 2015–16 | Vancouver Canucks | NHL | 1 | 0 | 0 | 0 | 0 | — | — | — | — | — |
| 2015–16 | Stockton Heat | AHL | 17 | 6 | 6 | 12 | 2 | — | — | — | — | — |
| 2015–16 | Calgary Flames | NHL | 7 | 2 | 1 | 3 | 2 | — | — | — | — | — |
| 2016–17 | Stockton Heat | AHL | 52 | 15 | 20 | 35 | 20 | 5 | 2 | 1 | 3 | 4 |
| 2016–17 | Calgary Flames | NHL | 7 | 0 | 1 | 1 | 2 | — | — | — | — | — |
| 2017–18 | Stockton Heat | AHL | 63 | 17 | 15 | 32 | 30 | — | — | — | — | — |
| 2018–19 | Laval Rocket | AHL | 54 | 5 | 5 | 10 | 20 | — | — | — | — | — |
| 2019–20 | Charlotte Checkers | AHL | 20 | 4 | 3 | 7 | 4 | — | — | — | — | — |
| 2019–20 | Kunlun Red Star | KHL | 19 | 3 | 6 | 9 | 16 | — | — | — | — | — |
| 2020–21 | Kunlun Red Star | KHL | 47 | 12 | 18 | 30 | 10 | — | — | — | — | — |
| 2021–22 | Dinamo Riga | KHL | 39 | 5 | 8 | 13 | 14 | — | — | — | — | — |
| 2021–22 | HV71 | Allsv | 8 | 0 | 3 | 3 | 0 | 15 | 3 | 8 | 11 | 6 |
| 2022–23 | Neftekhimik Nizhnekamsk | KHL | 19 | 2 | 3 | 5 | 4 | — | — | — | — | — |
| 2023–24 | Iserlohn Roosters | DEL | 28 | 5 | 9 | 14 | 12 | — | — | — | — | — |
| 2024–25 | Cardiff Devils | EIHL | 4 | 0 | 2 | 2 | 0 | — | — | — | — | — |
| NHL totals | | | 15 | 2 | 2 | 4 | 4 | — | — | — | — | — |
| KHL totals | | | 124 | 22 | 35 | 57 | 44 | — | — | — | — | — |

=== International ===
| Year | Team | Event | Result | GP | G | A | Pts | PIM |
|---|---|---|---|---|---|---|---|---|
| 2010 | Canada Pacific | U17 | 3rd place, bronze medalist(s) | 6 | 5 | 4 | 9 | 2 |
| 2011 | Canada | IH18 | 1st place, gold medalist(s) | 5 | 1 | 1 | 2 | 4 |
| 2012 | Canada | WJC18 | 3rd place, bronze medalist(s) | 6 | 4 | 4 | 8 | 6 |
| Junior totals | | | | 17 | 10 | 9 | 19 | 12 |

== Awards and honours ==
| Honours | Year | Ref |
|---|---|---|
| World U-17 Hockey Challenge bronze medal | 2010 | |
| World U-17 Hockey Challenge All-Star Team | 2010 | |
| IIHF World U18 Championship bronze medal | 2012 | |

Awards and achievements
| Preceded by Bo Horvat | Vancouver Canucks first-round draft pick 2013 | Succeeded by Jake Virtanen |
