= Kerby Rychel =

American-Canadian ice hockey player

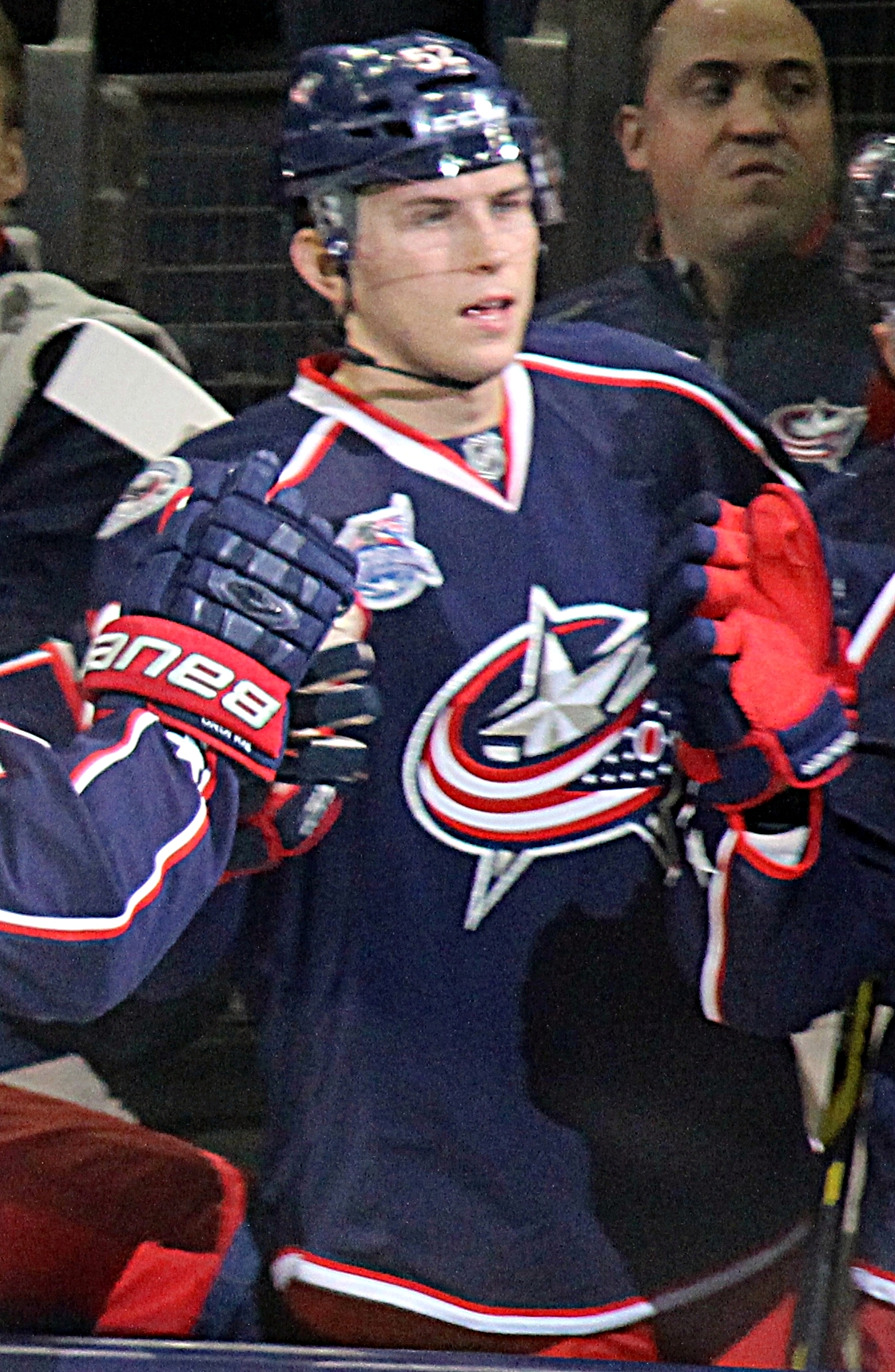
- Rychel with the Columbus Blue Jackets in 2014
- Born: October 7, 1994 (age 31) Torrance, California, U.S.
- Height: 6 ft 1 in (185 cm)
- Weight: 213 lb (97 kg; 15 st 3 lb)
- Position: Left wing
- Shot: Left
- Played for: Columbus Blue Jackets; Montreal Canadiens; Calgary Flames; Neftekhimik Nizhnekamsk
- NHL draft: 19th overall, 2013; Columbus Blue Jackets
- Playing career: 2014–2020

Kerby Rychel (born October 7, 1994) is an American-born Canadian former professional ice hockey forward. He most recently played under contract with the Charlotte Checkers of the American Hockey League (AHL). He was selected by the Columbus Blue Jackets in the first round (19th overall) of the 2013 NHL entry draft. He was born in Torrance, California, but grew up in Tecumseh, Ontario. He is the son of former NHL enforcer Warren Rychel.

== Playing career ==
Rychel was originally selected 21st overall in the 2011 OHL Priority Selection by the Barrie Colts.

Rychel was rated as a top prospect and was a first-round selection at the 2013 NHL Entry Draft.

In his debut professional season in 2014–15, on an injury-plagued Blue Jackets roster, Rychel was recalled from AHL affiliate the Springfield Falcons and made his NHL debut on November 29, 2014, against the Nashville Predators.

Rychel gained notoriety during the 2015–16 NHL season when reports surfaced that he had requested a trade out of Columbus over his lack of playing time at the NHL level. Rychel and his father, who also serves as his agent, held a meeting with management during the Blue Jackets development camp, raising concerns over Rychel being "buried" on the team's depth chart. Ultimately though, Rychel was not traded during the season, and split time between the club and their new AHL affiliate, the Lake Erie Monsters. The Monsters finished as one of the top teams in the league, and ultimately won the Calder Cup.

On June 25, 2016, less than an hour after the conclusion of the 2016 NHL entry draft, Rychel was traded by the Blue Jackets to the Toronto Maple Leafs in exchange for defenseman Scott Harrington and a conditional 5th round pick (condition was not met). The Maple Leafs were rumoured to be one of the teams most interested in Rychel following his earlier trade request. On February 25, 2018, Rychel was traded along with Rinat Valiev and a 2018 second-round pick to the Montreal Canadiens in exchange for Tomáš Plekanec and Kyle Baun.

As an unsigned restricted free agent with the Canadiens over the summer, Rychel was traded by the Canadiens to the Calgary Flames in exchange for fellow restricted free agent, Hunter Shinkaruk, on August 20, 2018, and signed a one-year contract with the Flames.

On June 25, 2019, Rychel was not tendered a qualifying offer by the Flames, enabling him to become a free agent. Rychel paused his North American career, agreeing to his first contract abroad in signing a one-year contract with Swedish club Örebro HK of the Swedish Hockey League (SHL) on July 27, 2019. Approaching the 2019–20 season, Rychel sought and was released from his contract with Örebro HK in order to later sign a one-year contract with Russian club HC Neftekhimik Nizhnekamsk on September 3, 2019.

Rychel struggled to adapt to the KHL and was scoreless in just 7 games with Neftekhimik before his contract was terminated on October 8, 2019. Following his brief stint in the KHL, Rychel returned to North America and opted to resume his career in the AHL, by agreeing to a one-year contract with the Charlotte Checkers, affiliate of the Carolina Hurricanes, on November 19, 2019. He notched 1 assist in 6 games with the Checkers before he was suspended by the team and removed from the roster.

== International play ==
During the 2010–11 season, Rychel won a gold medal with Team Ontario at the 2012 World U-17 Hockey Challenge, and during the 2011–12 season he won a bronze medal with Team Canada at the 2012 IIHF World U18 Championships. During the 2012–13 season he was an invited participant at the 2013 CHL Top Prospects Game.

== Career statistics ==
=== Regular season and playoffs ===
			Regular season					Playoffs
Season	Team	League	GP	G	A	Pts	PIM	GP	G	A	Pts	PIM
2010–11	Mississauga St. Michael's Majors	OHL	30	2	6	8	47	—	—	—	—	—
2010–11	Windsor Spitfires	OHL	32	5	8	13	26	18	2	5	7	14
2011–12	Windsor Spitfires	OHL	68	41	33	74	54	4	2	0	2	5
2012–13	Windsor Spitfires	OHL	68	40	47	87	94	—	—	—	—	—
2013–14	Windsor Spitfires	OHL	27	16	23	39	15	—	—	—	—	—
2013–14	Guelph Storm	OHL	31	18	33	51	28	20	11	21	32	23
2014–15	Springfield Falcons	AHL	51	12	21	33	43	—	—	—	—	—
2014–15	Columbus Blue Jackets	NHL	5	0	3	3	2	—	—	—	—	—
2015–16	Lake Erie Monsters	AHL	37	6	21	27	53	17	1	5	6	26
2015–16	Columbus Blue Jackets	NHL	32	2	7	9	15	—	—	—	—	—
2016–17	Toronto Marlies	AHL	73	19	33	52	118	11	2	3	5	2
2017–18	Toronto Marlies	AHL	55	10	20	30	36	—	—	—	—	—
2017–18	Laval Rocket	AHL	16	8	4	12	8	—	—	—	—	—
2017–18	Montreal Canadiens	NHL	4	1	1	2	2	—	—	—	—	—
2018–19	Stockton Heat	AHL	57	23	20	43	29	—	—	—	—	—
2018–19	Calgary Flames	NHL	2	0	0	0	0	—	—	—	—	—
2019–20	Neftekhimik Nizhnekamsk	KHL	7	0	0	0	6	—	—	—	—	—
2019–20	Charlotte Checkers	AHL	6	0	1	1	4	—	—	—	—	—
NHL totals			43	3	11	14	19	—	—	—	—	—

=== International ===
Year	Team	Event	Result	GP	G	A	Pts	PIM
2011	Canada Ontario	U17	1st place, gold medalist(s)	5	2	2	4	0
2012	Canada	WJC18	3rd place, bronze medalist(s)	7	5	3	8	12
2012	Canada	IH18	1st place, gold medalist(s)	5	1	1	2	0
2014	Canada	WJC	4th	7	0	0	0	0
Junior totals				24	8	6	14	12

== Awards and honors ==
Awards	Year
CHL
CHL Top Prospects Game	2013
CHL Memorial Cup All-Star Team	2014
AHL
All-Star Game	2016
Calder Cup (Lake Erie Monsters)	2016
International
World U-17 Hockey Challenge gold medal with Team Ontario	2012
Ivan Hlinka Memorial Tournament gold medal	2012
IIHF World U18 Championship bronze medal	2012

Awards and achievements
Preceded by Alexander Wennberg	Columbus Blue Jackets first-round draft pick 2013	Succeeded by Marko Daňo
