= Brendan Leipsic =

Canadian-Russian ice hockey player

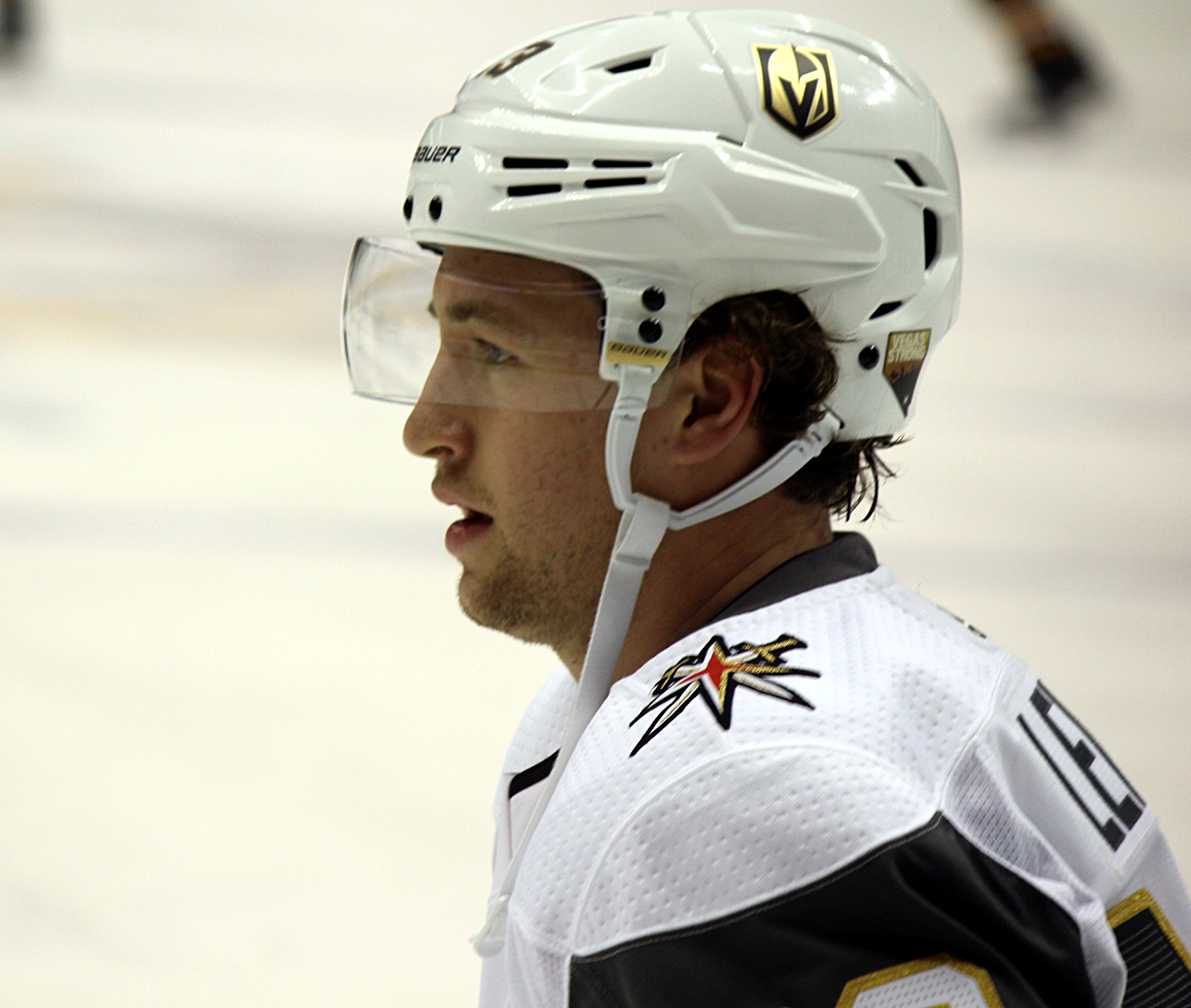
- Leipsic with the Vegas Golden Knights in 2018
- Born: May 19, 1994 (age 32) Winnipeg, Manitoba, Canada
- Height: 5 ft 10 in (178 cm)
- Weight: 180 lb (82 kg; 12 st 12 lb)
- Position: Left wing
- Shoots: Left
- team Former teams: Free agent Toronto Maple Leafs; Vegas Golden Knights; Vancouver Canucks; Los Angeles Kings; Washington Capitals; CSKA Moscow; Metallurg Magnitogorsk; SKA Saint Petersburg; Avtomobilist Yekaterinburg; Sibir Novosibirsk
- NHL draft: 89th overall, 2012; Nashville Predators
- Playing career: 2014–present

Brendan Leipsic (born May 19, 1994) is a Canadian-Russian professional ice hockey forward who is currently a free agent. Leipsic was selected by the Nashville Predators in the third round (89th overall) of the 2012 NHL entry draft.

After stints with the Toronto Maple Leafs, Vegas Golden Knights, Vancouver Canucks and Los Angeles Kings, he was signed by the Washington Capitals to a one-year, $700,000 contract on July 1, 2019. Leipsic was the subject of controversy after a conversation on his private Instagram account, where Leipsic made misogynistic comments about women and players' wives, was leaked to the public. In response to his conduct, on May 8, 2020, the Capitals placed Leipsic on unconditional waivers for purposes of terminating his contract. Leipsic cleared waivers the following day and his contract was terminated.

Following his termination from the Capitals, Leipsic moved to Russia to play in the Kontinental Hockey League. After three years in the country, Leipsic requested and was granted Russian citizenship on July 12, 2023.

== Personal ==
Leipsic was born in Winnipeg, Manitoba, Canada, and is Jewish. He is married to the Canadian actor Amalia Williamson and on April 1st, 2026 they welcomed their first child, a son named Brody. His mother Kathleen was a gymnast who was an alternate for Canada at the 1984 Los Angeles Olympics, and his father Greg was a high school running back. His brother Jeremey led the Manitoba Junior Hockey League in scoring in 2016/17 following which he played for the University of Manitoba Bisons hockey team; as well as a sister, Emma, who was an international gymnast.

== Playing career ==
=== Junior ===
Leipsic played in the WHL from the 2010–11 season. He was a member of Canada's National Junior Team for the 2012 Canada-Russia Challenge.

In the 2012–13 season with the Portland Winterhawks, Leipsic scored 120 points in 68 games to win the CHL Top Scorer Award as the highest-scoring player in the Canadian Hockey League.

=== National Hockey League ===
==== Nashville Predators ====
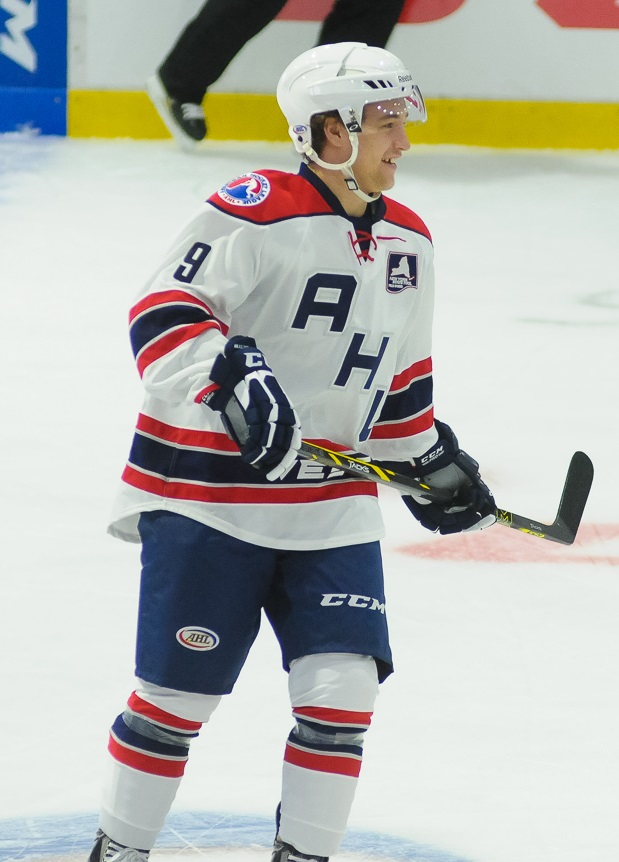
Leipsic at the 2015 AHL All-Star Game.

Leipsic was selected by the Nashville Predators in the third-round (89th overall) of the 2012 NHL entry draft. On May 23, 2013, the Predators signed Leipsic to a three-year entry-level contract.

Leipsic was assigned to the Predators AHL affiliate, the Milwaukee Admirals to begin his first professional season in 2014–15. He led the Admirals in rookie scoring with 36 points in 47 games.

==== Toronto Maple Leafs ====
On February 15, 2015, the Predators traded Leipsic along with Olli Jokinen and Nashville's 2015 first-round draft pick to the Toronto Maple Leafs in a package deal for Cody Franson and Mike Santorelli. Leipsic played an important role down the stretch in helping the Toronto Marlies (a team that struggled to score early in the year) reach the post-season.

Leipsic began the 2015–16 season with the Marlies, and would play there for most of the year. However, in February 2016, the Maple Leafs lineup was depleted due to injuries. Wanting to allow younger players to remain in the AHL and develop, Toronto initially called up older veterans.

When injury struck again however, Leipsic was called up on February 13, 2016, in reward for his strong play, along with Jeremy Morin, both on an emergency basis. Leipsic made his debut the same night, in a road game against the Vancouver Canucks, and scored his first NHL goal midway through the second period, batting a flying puck out of mid-air and past goaltender Ryan Miller. The reaction of Leipsic's parents, who were in attendance and flew last minute to the game, garnered much media attention. Leipsic became the first Maple Leafs' player to score a goal in his NHL debut since Nikolay Kulemin in 2008. Leipsic was sent back to the Marlies shortly after his debut.

==== Vegas Golden Knights ====
On June 21, 2017, Leipsic was left exposed at the 2017 NHL Expansion Draft by the Toronto Maple Leafs, and was selected by the Vegas Golden Knights. He signed a two-year $1.3 million contract in July 2017.

==== Vancouver Canucks ====
On February 26, 2018, Leipsic was traded to the Vancouver Canucks in exchange for Philip Holm.

==== Los Angeles Kings ====
In the 2018–19 season, on December 3, 2018, Leipsic was placed on waivers by the Canucks and claimed by the Los Angeles Kings.

==== Washington Capitals ====
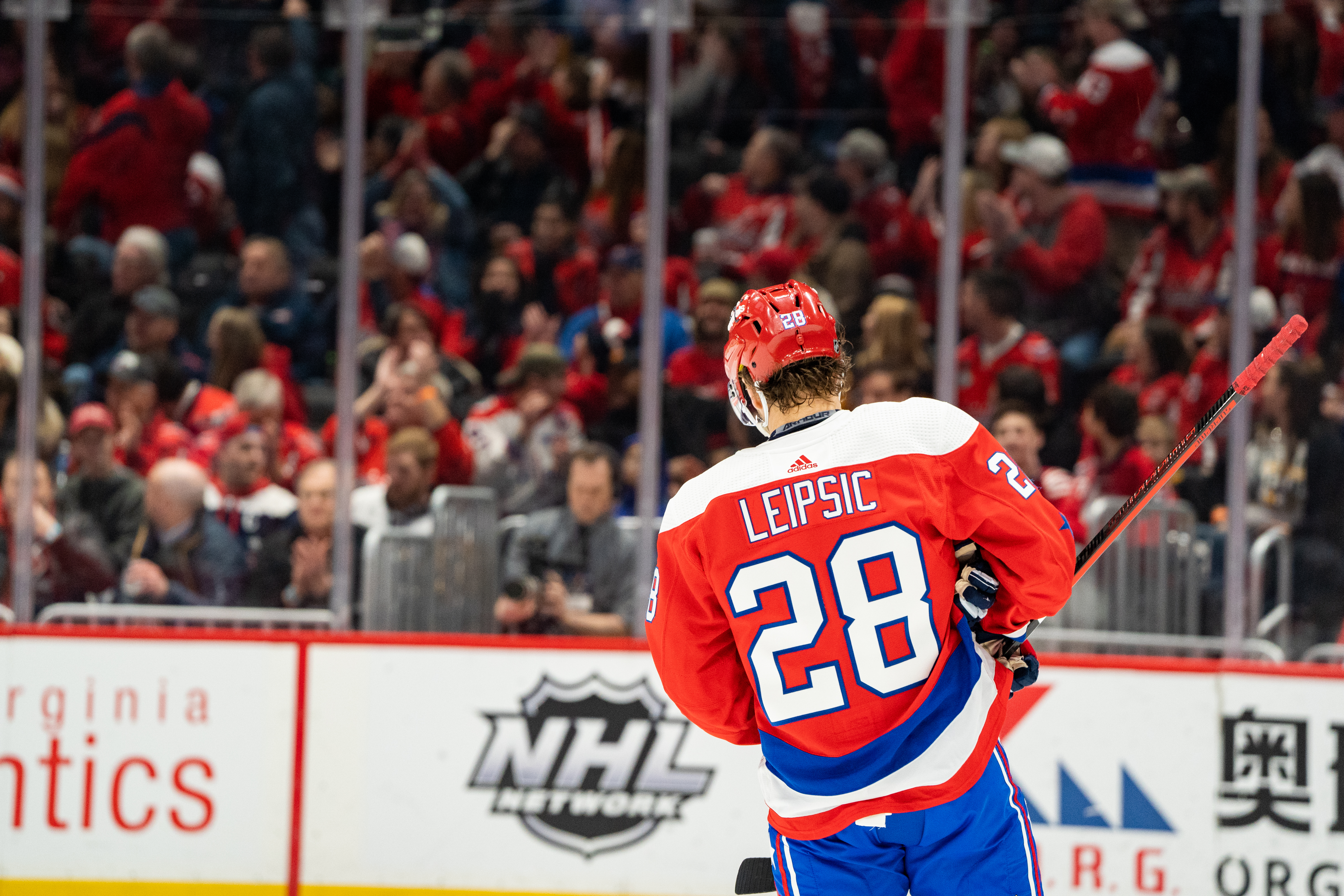
Leipsic with the Capitals in February 2020

Leipsic was not tendered a qualifying offer by the Kings and was released as a free agent on June 25, 2019. He was signed by the Washington Capitals to a one-year, $700,000 contract on July 1, 2019. In the 2019–20 season, Leipsic remained on the Capitals roster for opening night. In a depth forward role, Leipsic registered 3 goals and 8 assists for 11 points in 61 games, before the season was suspended due to the COVID-19 pandemic.

=== Kontinental Hockey League ===
==== HC CSKA Moscow ====
Leipsic's contract with the Capitals was terminated in May 2020 due to a disrespectful private group chat was leaked in which he insulted women and his teammates. Leipsic opted to resume his career by agreeing to a one-year contract with the Russian club, HC CSKA Moscow of the KHL, on August 4, 2020. In the 2020–21 season, he posted 11 goals and 24 points in 42 regular season games along with 8 points in 16 playoff games.

==== Metallurg Magnitogorsk ====
On May 7, 2021, Leipsic was traded by CSKA to Metallurg Magnitogorsk in exchange for the rights to Lias Andersson, and immediately signed a two-year contract with the club. He participated in the 2021–22 playoffs, despite the exit of many North American-born players and two of the KHL's non-Russia-based teams due to the 2022 Russian invasion of Ukraine.

==== SKA Saint Petersburg ====
On June 23, 2023, Leipsic continued his tenure in the KHL by signing as a free agent to a two-year contract with perennially contending club, SKA Saint Petersburg. In the 2023–24 season, Leipsic was largely plagued through injury and he posted just 2 goals and 2 assists through 19 regular season games.

==== Avtomobilist Yekaterinburg ====
Leipsic tenure with SKA ending after a lone season and on May 31, 2024, he was signed to a two-year contract with his fourth KHL club, Avtomobilist Yekaterinburg.

==== Sibir Novosibirsk ====
On December 21, 2024, Leipsic was traded from Avtomobilist to his fifth KHL club, HC Sibir Novosibirsk in exchange for the KHL rights to Finnish centre Janne Kuokkanen in a move that helped Avtomobilist "comply with the salary cap.

==== SKA Saint Petersburg ====
In November 2025 Leipsic signed with SKA St.Petersburg where he resumed his career in the KHL. On March 23, 2026 Leipsic’s KHL contract with SKA was terminated by mutual agreement. He posted 10 goals and 6 assists in 31 regular season games.

== Career statistics ==
=== Regular season and playoffs ===
			Regular season					Playoffs
Season	Team	League	GP	G	A	Pts	PIM	GP	G	A	Pts	PIM
2010–11	Portland Winterhawks	WHL	68	16	17	33	50	21	3	4	7	14
2011–12	Portland Winterhawks	WHL	65	28	30	58	82	20	7	8	15	28
2012–13	Portland Winterhawks	WHL	68	49	71	120	103	21	10	14	24	41
2013–14	Portland Winterhawks	WHL	60	39	52	91	111	20	14	19	33	49
2014–15	Milwaukee Admirals	AHL	47	7	29	36	16	—	—	—	—	—
2014–15	Toronto Marlies	AHL	27	7	12	19	6	5	1	2	3	14
2015–16	Toronto Marlies	AHL	65	20	34	54	55	13	2	2	4	12
2015–16	Toronto Maple Leafs	NHL	6	1	2	3	2	—	—	—	—	—
2016–17	Toronto Marlies	AHL	49	18	33	51	30	11	4	1	5	21
2017–18	Vegas Golden Knights	NHL	44	2	11	13	4	—	—	—	—	—
2017–18	Vancouver Canucks	NHL	14	3	6	9	10	—	—	—	—	—
2018–19	Vancouver Canucks	NHL	17	2	3	5	2	—	—	—	—	—
2018–19	Los Angeles Kings	NHL	45	5	13	18	22	—	—	—	—	—
2019–20	Washington Capitals	NHL	61	3	8	11	13	—	—	—	—	—
2020–21	CSKA Moscow	KHL	42	11	13	24	20	16	3	5	8	6
2021–22	Metallurg Magnitogorsk	KHL	46	16	19	35	18	24	11	9	20	10
2022–23	Metallurg Magnitogorsk	KHL	65	11	33	44	28	11	2	9	11	4
2023–24	SKA Saint Petersburg	KHL	19	2	2	4	6	2	0	0	0	0
2024–25	Avtomobilist Yekaterinburg	KHL	25	6	1	7	4	—	—	—	—	—
2024–25	Sibir Novosibirsk	KHL	29	6	11	17	2	7	0	0	0	2
2025–26	SKA Saint Petersburg	KHL	31	10	6	16	10	—	—	—	—	—
NHL totals			187	16	43	59	53	—	—	—	—	—
KHL totals			257	62	85	147	88	60	16	23	39	22

=== International ===
Year	Team	Event	Result	GP	G	A	Pts	PIM
2011	Canada Western	U17	6th	5	3	2	5	6
Junior totals				5	3	2	5	6

== Awards and honors ==
Award	Year
CHL
Top Scorer Award	2012–13

== See also ==
- List of select Jewish ice hockey players
