= HC Škoda Plzeň =

Ice hockey team

- City: Plzeň, Czech Republic
- League: Czech Extraliga
- Founded: 1929
- Home arena: Logspeed CZ Arena (Capacity: 8,236)
- Colours: Blue, white
- General manager: (Czech Republic) Martin Straka
- Head coach: (Czech Republic) Josef Jandač
- Captain: (Czech Republic) Jakub Jeřábek
- Website: hcplzen.cz

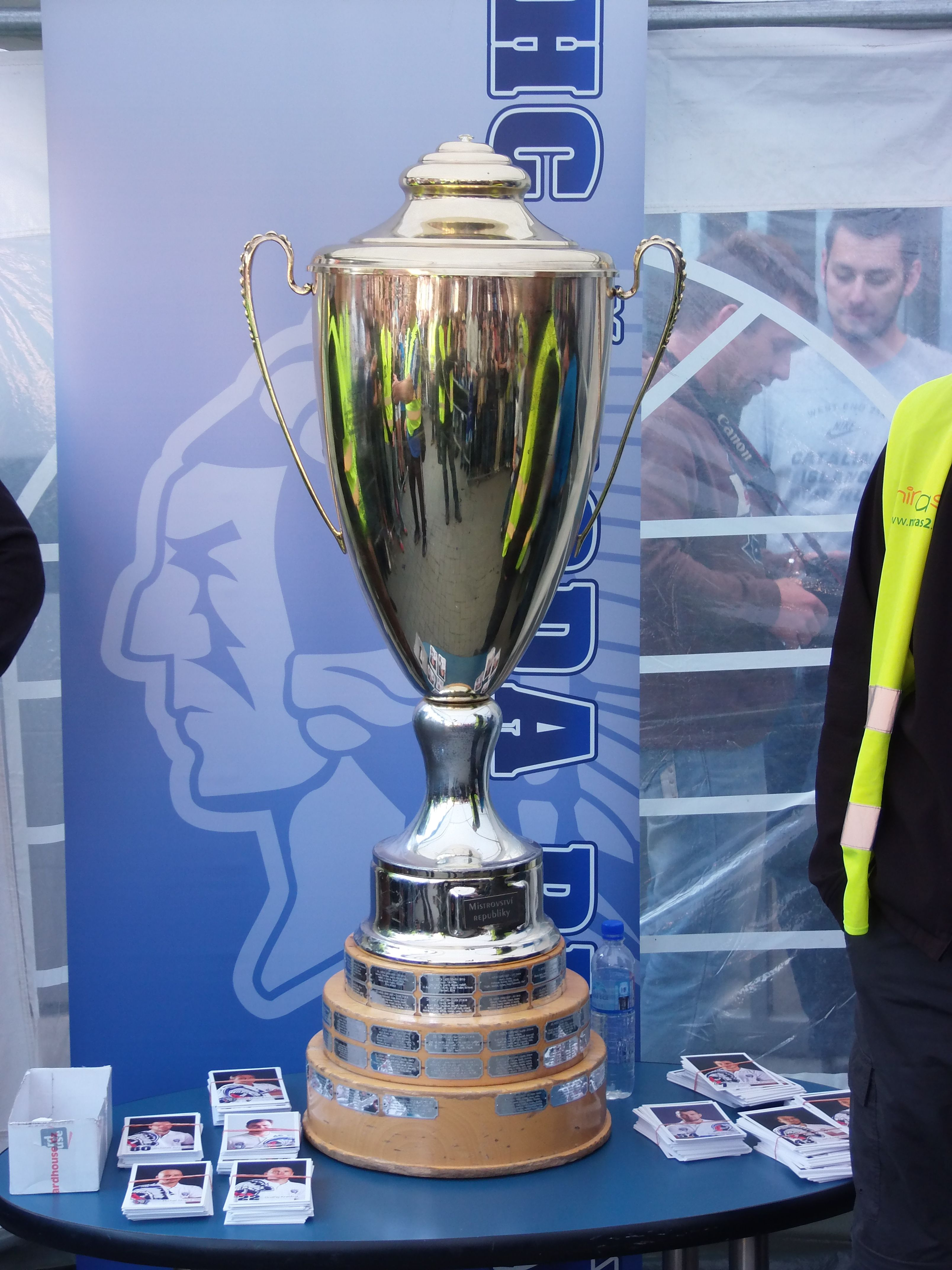
T. G. Masaryk Cup for the winner of the Czech Extraliga, 2013

HC Škoda Plzeň is a professional ice hockey team based in Plzeň, Czech Republic and was founded in 1929. They currently play in the Czech Extraliga, with their home games being held at Logspeed CZ Arena. In 2013, for the first time in history, HC Plzeň were the Czech Extraliga champions after beating Zlín 4:3 in the seventh game of the dramatic final.

== Club names ==
- 1929 – Hokejový klub při SK (Sportovní klub) Viktoria Plzeň
- 1948 – Sokol Plzeň IV
- 1949 – ZSJ Škodovy závody
- 1952 – ZSJ Leninovy závody
- 1953 – Spartak Plzeň LZ
- 1965 – TJ Škoda Plzeň
- 1991 – HC Škoda Plzeň
- 1994 – HC Interconnex Plzeň
- 1995 – HC ZKZ Plzeň
- 1997 – HC Keramika Plzeň
- 2003 – HC Lasselsberger Plzeň
- 2009 – HC Plzeň 1929
- 2012 – HC Škoda Plzeň

== Honours ==
- Czechoslovak First Ice Hockey League - Runner-up (1958,1959,1992) Third place (1957)
- Czech Extraliga - Champion (2013), Third Place (2000,2012) Presidents Trophy (2010)

== Notable players ==
- Vladimír Bednář
- Bohuslav Ebermann
- Milan Kajkl
- Jiří Kučera
- Dušan Salfický
- Martin Straka
- Petr Sýkora
- Jaroslav Špaček
- Tuukka Rask
- Dominik Kubalík
- Ryan Hollweg

== Players ==
=== Current roster ===
Source: hcplzen.czSource: eliteprospects.comAs of May 19, 2026.

No.	Nat	Player	Pos	S/G	Age	Acquired	Birthplace
42	(Czech Republic)	Matyas Filip	C	L	25	2025	Jindřichův Hradec, Czech Republic
70	(Czech Republic)	Marek Horejsi	F	L	20	2024	Plzen, Czech Republic
5	(Czech Republic)	Jakub Jeřábek (C)	D	L	35	2025	Plzen, Czech Republic
59	(Czech Republic)	Adam Kubík	LW	L	27	2026	Kladno, Czech Republic
65	(Czech Republic)	David Kvasnička	D	L	27	2020	Rokycany, Czech Republic
47	(Finland)	Ville Lajunen	D	R	38	2025	Helsinki, Finland
9	(Canada)	Christophe Lalancette	C	R	32	2024	Roberval, Quebec, Canada
30	(Czech Republic)	Jakub Lev	C	R	35	2023	Plzeň, Czechoslovakia
8	(Czech Republic)	Daniel Malák	D	L	23	2022	Plzeň, Czech Republic
31	(Czech Republic)	Nick Malik	G	L	24	2024	Raleigh, North Carolina, United States
22	(Czech Republic)	Adam Mechura	C	L	23	2024	Písek, Czech Republic
13	(Ukraine)	Igor Merezhko	D	R	28	2024	Kharkiv, Ukraine
29	(Canada)	Stuart Percy	D	L	33	2025	Oakville, Ontario, Canada
63	(Finland)	Mikko Petman	RW	R	25	2025	Lappeenranta, Finland
23	(Finland)	Ville Petman	C	L	26	2025	Lappeenranta, Finland
26	(Czech Republic)	Ondrej Psenicka	RW	L	25	2025	Prague, Czech Republic
17	(Czech Republic)	Ondrej Rohlik	LW	L	24	2025	Chrudim, Czech Republic
94	(Latvia)	Kristians Rubins (A)	D	L	28	2024	Jūrmala, Latvia
33	(Czech Republic)	Jan Ruzicka	G	L	28	2025	Mlada Boleslav, Czech Republic
41	(Czech Republic)	Radim Salda	D	L	27	2024	Pardubice, Czech Republic
84	(Czech Republic)	Jan Schleiss (A)	RW	R	31	2021	Plzeň, Czech Republic
14	(Czech Republic)	Ivo Sedláček	F	R	22	2025	Brno, Czech Republic
34	(Czech Republic)	Jakub Siler	F	L	22	2023	
49	(Czech Republic)	Dominik Simon	C	L	31	2024	Prague, Czech Republic
76	(Czech Republic)	Marek Soukup	F	L	21	2022	Plzeň, Czech Republic
18	(Czech Republic)	Lukas Strnad	RW	R	21	2025	Prague, Czech Republic
92	(Czech Republic)	Michal Teplý	LW	R	24	2025	Havlíčkův Brod, Czech Republic
20	(Czech Republic)	Petr Zámorský	D	R	33	2022	Zlín, Czech Republic

== Arena ==
Home Monitoring Aréna was built at 1969 and currently holds 8,236 people.

== Controversy ==
During the 2010–2011 season, the team was docked 19 points for having used players who were not correctly registered to the club, an affair which also involved the clubs BK Mladá Boleslav and HC Kladno.
