= Cameron Butler =

Canadian ice hockey player (born 2002)

- Born: June 9, 2002 (age 24) Ottawa, Ontario, Canada
- Height: 6 ft 4 in (193 cm)
- Weight: 215 lb (98 kg; 15 st 5 lb)
- Position: Right wing
- Shoots: Right
- NHL team (P) Cur. team Former teams: Detroit Red Wings; Grand Rapids Griffins (AHL); Columbus Blue Jackets
- NHL draft: Undrafted
- Playing career: 2022–present

Cameron Butler (born June 9, 2002) is a Canadian professional ice hockey right winger for the Grand Rapids Griffins in the American Hockey League (AHL) while under contract to the Detroit Red Wings of the National Hockey League (NHL).

== Playing career ==
Butler played for the Ottawa Jr. 67s under-14 team from 2014–15 to 2015–16, recording 40 points in 30 games. He attended St. Andrew's College, Aurora, where he played for the hockey team, scoring four points in 2016–17 and one point in 2017–18. He also was a member of the York Simcoe Express U16 team in 2016–17, totaling 21 goals and 21 assists, and in 2017–18, scoring 57 points on 27 goals and 30 assists.

Butler was selected in the second round – 27th overall – by the Peterborough Petes in the 2018 Ontario Hockey League (OHL) Priority Selection. In his first year with the team, he suited up for 66 games and scored 18 goals along with eight assists, for 26 total points. Butler played 39 games with the Petes in the 2019–20 season and scored 12 goals with nine assists before being traded to the Niagara IceDogs, with which he totaled six goals and seven assists while appearing in 27 games.

Butler was eligible for the 2020 NHL entry draft, but went unselected. No games were played in the 2020–21 OHL season, due to the COVID-19 pandemic. He became team captain of the IceDogs in 2021–22 and had 22 points (six goals, 16 assists) in 24 games before being traded in January 2022 to the Oshawa Generals. He finished out the season with them and had five goals and 13 assists in 40 games. Butler returned to the Generals for the 2022–23 season and recorded 55 points (27 goals, 28 assists) in 63 games.

Butler signed an amateur tryout contract (ATO) near the end of the 2022–23 AHL season with the Cleveland Monsters. He appeared in three games that season for the team. On March 16, 2023, he signed a three-year, entry-level contract with the Columbus Blue Jackets of the National Hockey League (NHL). He played most of the 2023–24 season with the Monsters.

On March 30, 2024, Butler was added to the Blue Jackets' roster as an emergency recall. The team's captain, Boone Jenner, had informed them that he was ill shortly before the game and the Blue Jackets had no extra players, "[b]ut there was a forward [Butler] ... two hours up the road." Butler was contacted and told to come as soon as possible. According to NHL.com, he "had the good fortune not to get pulled over as he raced" to the stadium in time for the game, arriving only a few minutes before it started. He ultimately played one shift – 54 seconds – in his NHL debut, a 4–3 win over the Pittsburgh Penguins. He returned to the Monsters after the game. One year later, on June 26, 2025, Butler was traded to the Minnesota Wild in exchange for Brendan Gaunce.

After a lone season within the Wild organization, Butler left as a free agent and was signed to a one-year, two-way contract with the Detroit Red Wings for the 2026–27 season on July 1, 2026.

== International play ==
Butler played for Team Canada White at the 2018 World U-17 Hockey Challenge. He appeared in five games, recording no statistics.

== Personal life ==
Butler was born on June 9, 2002, in Ottawa, Ontario.

== Career statistics ==
=== Regular season and playoffs ===
			Regular season					Playoffs
Season	Team	League	GP	G	A	Pts	PIM	GP	G	A	Pts	PIM
2016–17	St. Andrew's College	CAHS	6	1	2	3	0	—	—	—	—	—
2017–18	St. Andrew's College	CAHS	2	0	1	1	2	—	—	—	—	—
2018–19	Peterborough Petes	OHL	64	18	8	26	55	—	—	—	—	—
2019–20	Peterborough Petes	OHL	39	12	7	19	24	—	—	—	—	—
2019–20	Niagara IceDogs	OHL	27	6	7	13	21	—	—	—	—	—
2021–22	Niagara IceDogs	OHL	24	6	17	23	22	—	—	—	—	—
2021–22	Oshawa Generals	OHL	40	5	13	18	56	4	1	1	2	11
2022–23	Oshawa Generals	OHL	63	27	28	55	119	5	2	1	3	15
2022–23	Cleveland Monsters	AHL	3	0	0	0	0	—	—	—	—	—
2023–24	Cleveland Monsters	AHL	51	2	6	8	71	—	—	—	—	—
2023–24	Columbus Blue Jackets	NHL	1	0	0	0	0	—	—	—	—	—
2024–25	Cleveland Monsters	AHL	37	2	1	3	74	—	—	—	—	—
2025–26	Iowa Wild	AHL	16	1	0	1	20	—	—	—	—	—
2025–26	Iowa Heartlanders	ECHL	30	9	11	20	77	—	—	—	—	—
NHL totals			1	0	0	0	0	—	—	—	—	—

=== International ===
Year	Team	Event	Result	GP	G	A	Pts	PIM
2018	Canada White	U17	6th	5	0	0	0	6
Junior totals				5	0	0	0	6
