= Thomas Di Pauli =

Italian-born American ice hockey player (born 1994)

- Born: April 29, 1994 (age 32) Caldaro, Italy
- Height: 5 ft 11 in (180 cm)
- Weight: 188 lb (85 kg; 13 st 6 lb)
- Position: Forward
- Shot: Left
- Played for: Pittsburgh Penguins
- NHL draft: 100th overall, 2012; Washington Capitals
- Playing career: 2016–2020

Thomas Di Pauli von Treuheim (born April 29, 1994) is an Italian-born American former professional ice hockey player. He played as a forward for the Pittsburgh Penguins of the National Hockey League (NHL). He was drafted in the fourth round, 100th overall in 2012 by the Washington Capitals.

== Early life ==
Di Pauli was born April 29, 1994, to Christina DiPauli and Alexander Di Pauli von Treuheim, in Caldaro, a small town in northern Italy where he lived until he was 12 years old.

Di Pauli moved to the United States in 2007 after his brother was scouted by the Chicago Mission AAA Youth Hockey Club. Thomas accompanied his brother to try and make a younger team with the organization; while his brother, Theo, was playing for the Chicago Mission Bantam Major AAA team, Thomas successfully tried out for the Chicago Mission Bantam Minor AAA team. Di Pauli graduated to the Bantam Major AAA team, and then the Under-16 team in the subsequent two years.

== Playing career ==
After graduating from the Chicago Mission organization, Di Pauli joined the U.S. National Team Development Program of the United States Hockey League (USHL), before committing to play for the University of Notre Dame, while studyinf marketing in Notre Dame's Mendoza College of Business. Di Pauli served as the Fighting Irish's alternate captain and earned the team's Offensive MVP award in his final season.

Di Pauli was drafted in the fourth round, 100th overall, in 2012 by the Washington Capitals, only the second Italian-born player to ever be drafted to the National Hockey League (NHL), after Luca Sbisa was drafted the 19th overall in 2008. After four seasons at Notre Dame, Di Pauli elected to become a free agent instead of signing with Washington, and on August 19, 2016, Di Pauli signed an entry-level contract with the Pittsburgh Penguins as an unrestricted free agent.

In the final year of his entry-level contract in the 2018–19 season, Di Pauli was on track to improve his offensive contribution, posting 15 points in just 29 games before suffering a season-ending lower-body injury. As an impending restricted free agent, Di Pauli agreed to a one-year, two-way extension with the Pittsburgh Penguins on May 1, 2019.

== Personal life ==
Di Pauli has one brother, Theo Di Pauli von Treuheim, and one sister, Sandra Di Pauli. Theo played for Chicago Steel of the USHL and Union College where he studied bioengineering and pre-medicine. Thomas moved with his brother, sister and mother to the United States, while their father Alexander remained in Italy and traveled back and forth to see them when he could.

Knowing Italian, Di Pauli is trilingual, as the main language in the town he grew up in was German and his mother, Christina, was from the United States, and he would speak English with her.

== Career statistics ==
=== Regular season and playoffs ===
			Regular season					Playoffs
Season	Team	League	GP	G	A	Pts	PIM	GP	G	A	Pts	PIM
2010–11	U.S. National Development Team	USHL	32	4	11	15	16	2	0	1	1	0
2011–12	U.S. National Development Team	USHL	21	6	5	11	6	—	—	—	—	—
2012–13	Notre Dame	CCHA	41	5	7	12	31	—	—	—	—	—
2013–14	Notre Dame	HE	26	3	2	5	12	—	—	—	—	—
2014–15	Notre Dame	HE	41	8	21	29	24	—	—	—	—	—
2015–16	Notre Dame	HE	37	14	18	32	16	—	—	—	—	—
2016–17	Wilkes-Barre/Scranton Penguins	AHL	21	2	0	2	20	—	—	—	—	—
2017–18	Wilkes-Barre/Scranton Penguins	AHL	58	12	8	20	38	—	—	—	—	—
2018–19	Wilkes-Barre/Scranton Penguins	AHL	29	7	8	15	32	—	—	—	—	—
2019–20	Wilkes-Barre/Scranton Penguins	AHL	39	8	9	17	24	—	—	—	—	—
2019–20	Pittsburgh Penguins	NHL	2	0	0	0	10	—	—	—	—	—
NHL totals			2	0	0	0	10	—	—	—	—	—

=== International ===
Year	Team	Event	Result	GP	G	A	Pts	PIM
2011	United States	U17	2nd place, silver medalist(s)	5	2	4	6	8
2012	United States	WJC18	1st place, gold medalist(s)	6	1	0	1	0
2014	United States	WJC	5th	5	0	3	3	2
Junior totals				16	3	7	10	10

== Awards and honors ==
Award	Year	Ref
College
HE Honorable Mention All-Star Team	2016	
