= Andreas Athanasiou =

Canadian ice hockey player (born 1994)

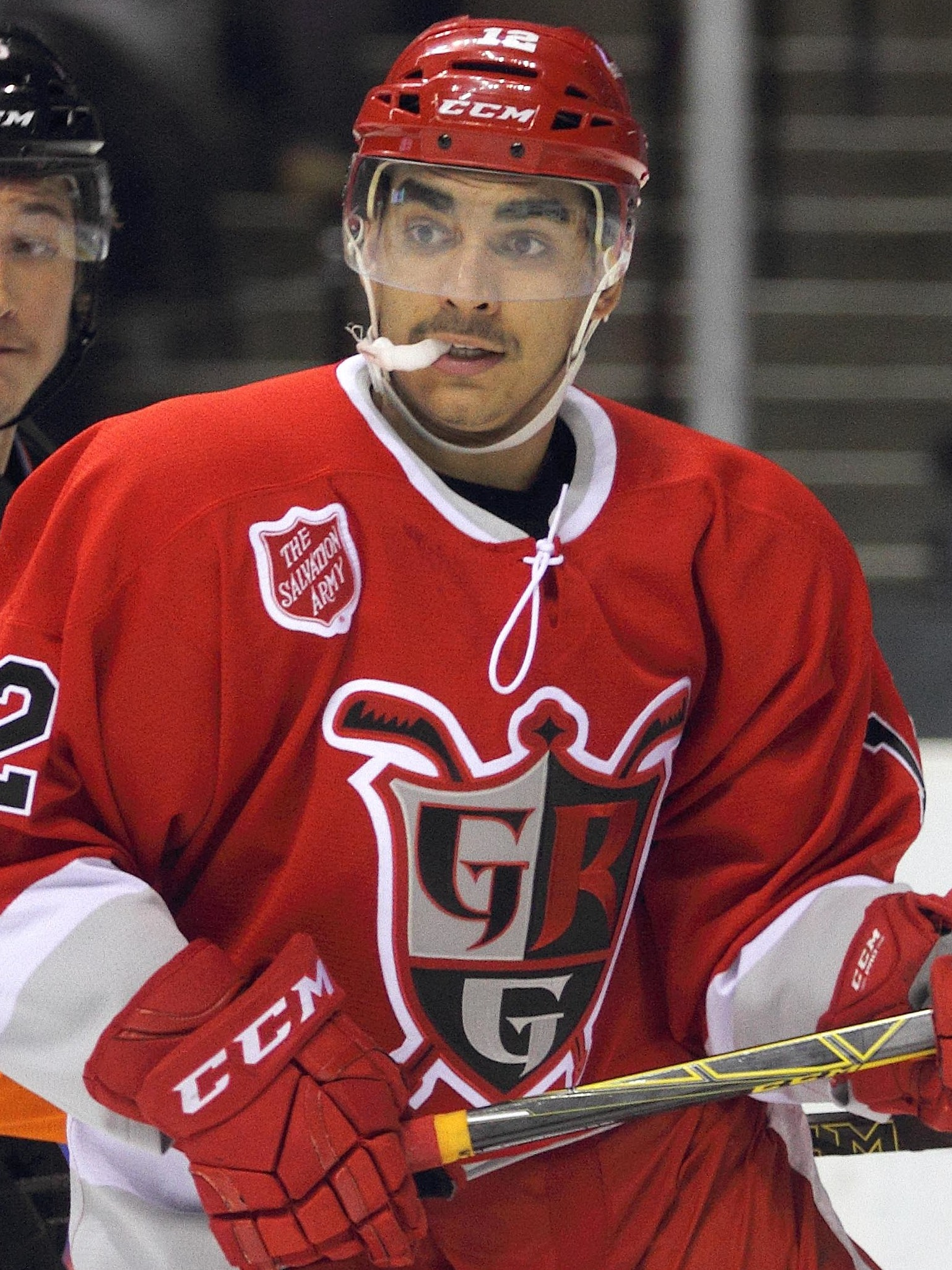
- Athanasiou with the Grand Rapids Griffins in 2015
- Born: 6 August 1994 (age 31) Woodbridge, Ontario, Canada
- Height: 6 ft 2 in (188 cm)
- Weight: 192 lb (87 kg; 13 st 10 lb)
- Position: Centre
- Shoots: Left
- NHL team Former teams: Free Agent; Detroit Red Wings; Edmonton Oilers; Los Angeles Kings; Chicago Blackhawks
- NHL draft: 110th overall, 2012; Detroit Red Wings
- Playing career: 2014–present

Andreas Athanasiou (/æθənəˈsiːuː/ ath-ə-nə-SEE-oo; born August 6, 1994) is a Canadian professional ice hockey player who is a centre. He most recently played for the Rockford IceHogs of the American Hockey League (AHL) while under contract to the Chicago Blackhawks of the National Hockey League (NHL). Athanasiou was drafted 110th overall by the Detroit Red Wings in the 2012 NHL entry draft.

== Playing career ==
=== Junior ===
During the 2009–10 season, Athanasiou scored at a better than a point-per-game pace playing for the Toronto Titans Midget AAA team in the Greater Toronto Hockey League. Athanasiou recorded 24 goals and 34 assists in 56 games. Athanasiou was drafted by London 81st overall in the 2010 OHL Priority Draft.

During the 2010–11 season, Athanasiou skated in 57 games as an OHL rookie with the London Knights. Athanasiou recorded 11 goals and 11 assists. The Knights reached the OHL playoffs despite finishing last in the Midwest Division. In six playoff games, Athanasiou was minus-one with no points or penalties.

During the 2011–12 season, Athanasiou was one of five players to score 20 or more goals on a London Knights team that finished with the OHL's best record. Athanasiou recorded 22 goals and 15 assists in 63 games. Athanasiou skated in nine of the Knights' first 17 playoff games as London reached the conference finals and recorded one goal and 3 assists. Athanasiou was invited to the NHL draft combine and ranked 41st amongst North American skaters in Central Scouting's final rankings before the 2012 NHL entry draft.

During the 2012–13 season, Athanasiou skated for the Barrie Colts in his third OHL season after being obtained by the Colts in an August 2012 trade with London. Athanasiou was the fourth-leading scorer for the Colts, finishing third on the team with 29 goals and recording 38 assists in 66 games. Barrie reached the OHL championship against Athanasiou's former team. In 22 playoff games, Athanasiou recorded 12 goals and 13 assists. Athanasiou joined the Detroit Red Wings' AHL affiliate Grand Rapids Griffins during the Calder Cup playoffs but did not appear in any games.

During the 2013–14 season, Athanasiou led Barrie in scoring, and ranked fifth in the league in scoring during his final OHL season, recording 49 goals and 46 assists in 66 games.

=== Professional ===
==== Detroit Red Wings ====
On November 20, 2013, the Detroit Red Wings signed Athanasiou to a three-year, entry-level contract.

On April 15, 2014, Athanasiou was assigned to the Grand Rapids Griffins, and made his AHL debut on April 18, in a game against the Lake Erie Monsters.

During the 2014–15 season, in his first full professional season, he posted the best point-per-game average, 0.58, among Griffins rookies, recording 16 goals and 16 assists in a campaign that was limited to 55 games played due to a broken jaw. He finished fifth on Grand Rapids in postseason scoring, recording five goals and four assists in 16 postseason games.

Athanasiou made his NHL debut for the Red Wings on November 8, 2015, in a game against the Dallas Stars. On November 10, in his second NHL game, Athanasiou scored his first career NHL goal against Braden Holtby of the Washington Capitals. On February 5, 2016, Athanasiou was recalled by the Detroit Red Wings. Before being recalled, he recorded eight goals and eight assists in 26 games for the Griffins.

On April 30, 2016, Athanasiou was assigned to the Grand Rapids Griffins. During the 2015–16 season, Athanasiou recorded nine goals and five assists in 37 games for the Red Wings, while averaging 9:01 of ice time. On October 21, 2017 - following a contract holdout to begin the season - Athanasiou and the Red Wings agreed to terms on a one-year deal worth $1,387,500.

During the 2019–20 season, Athanasiou recorded 10 goals and 14 assists in 46 games with the Red Wings, and owned a league-worst plus/minus -45.

==== Edmonton Oilers ====
On February 24, 2020, Athanasiou was traded by the Red Wings at the NHL trade deadline, along with Ryan Kuffner, to the Edmonton Oilers in exchange for Sam Gagner and a second-round draft pick in 2020 and 2021. He registered 1 goal and 1 assist in 9 regular season games before the season was paused due to the COVID-19 pandemic. In return for the post-season, Athanasiou went scoreless in four games as the Oilers failed to make it through the play-in round and missed the playoffs.

As an impending restricted free agent and due to salary cap considerations, Athanasiou was not tendered a qualifying offer by the Oilers on October 7, 2020, and was released to explore free agency.

==== Los Angeles Kings ====
On December 28, 2020, Athanasiou signed a one-year, $1.2 million contract with the Los Angeles Kings. On July 28, 2021, Athanasiou signed a one-year, $2.7 million contract with the Los Angeles Kings.

==== Chicago Blackhawks ====
As a free agent from the Kings, Athanasiou joined his fourth NHL team after signing a one-year, $3 million contract with the Chicago Blackhawks on July 13, 2022. On June 7, 2023, Athanasiou signed a two-year extension with the Blackhawks worth $4,250,000 AAV. On November 24, 2024, after being a healthy scratch for much of the start of the year, the Blackhawks assigned Athanasiou to the Rockford IceHogs of the American Hockey League.

== International play ==
Medal record

Representing Canada

Ice hockey

Ivan Hlinka Memorial Tournament
| Gold medal – first place | 2011 Slovakia | |

Representing Ontario

World U-17 Hockey Challenge
| Gold medal – first place | 2011 Manitoba | |

Athanasiou was part of the gold medal-winning Ontario team at the 2011 World U-17 Hockey Challenge. Athanasiou was one of five players for Ontario who had five or more points in the five-game WHC, finishing with two goals and three assists.

== Personal life ==
Athanasiou is ethnically of Greek and Guyanese descent. His father is a pilot with Air Canada.

In 2017, Athanasiou adopted a vegan diet.

From 2019 to 2025, Athanasiou dated professional golfer Nelly Korda.

== Career statistics ==
=== Regular season and playoffs ===
| | | | Regular season | | | | | Playoffs |
| Season | Team | League | GP | G | A | Pts | PIM | GP | G | A | Pts | PIM |
|---|---|---|---|---|---|---|---|---|---|---|---|---|
| 2009–10 | Toronto Titans | GTHL | 56 | 24 | 34 | 58 | 32 | — | — | — | — | — |
| 2010–11 | London Knights | OHL | 57 | 11 | 11 | 22 | 21 | 6 | 0 | 0 | 0 | 0 |
| 2011–12 | London Knights | OHL | 63 | 22 | 15 | 37 | 22 | 11 | 1 | 4 | 5 | 0 |
| 2012–13 | Barrie Colts | OHL | 66 | 29 | 38 | 67 | 30 | 22 | 12 | 13 | 25 | 11 |
| 2013–14 | Barrie Colts | OHL | 66 | 49 | 46 | 95 | 52 | — | — | — | — | — |
| 2013–14 | Grand Rapids Griffins | AHL | 2 | 1 | 2 | 3 | 0 | 6 | 0 | 1 | 1 | 6 |
| 2014–15 | Grand Rapids Griffins | AHL | 55 | 16 | 16 | 32 | 25 | 16 | 5 | 4 | 9 | 6 |
| 2015–16 | Grand Rapids Griffins | AHL | 26 | 8 | 8 | 16 | 9 | 6 | 2 | 3 | 5 | 2 |
| 2015–16 | Detroit Red Wings | NHL | 37 | 9 | 5 | 14 | 5 | 5 | 1 | 0 | 1 | 0 |
| 2016–17 | Detroit Red Wings | NHL | 64 | 18 | 11 | 29 | 28 | — | — | — | — | — |
| 2017–18 | Detroit Red Wings | NHL | 71 | 16 | 17 | 33 | 16 | — | — | — | — | — |
| 2018–19 | Detroit Red Wings | NHL | 76 | 30 | 24 | 54 | 38 | — | — | — | — | — |
| 2019–20 | Detroit Red Wings | NHL | 46 | 10 | 14 | 24 | 26 | — | — | — | — | — |
| 2019–20 | Edmonton Oilers | NHL | 9 | 1 | 1 | 2 | 4 | 4 | 0 | 0 | 0 | 2 |
| 2020–21 | Los Angeles Kings | NHL | 47 | 10 | 13 | 23 | 27 | — | — | — | — | — |
| 2021–22 | Los Angeles Kings | NHL | 28 | 11 | 6 | 17 | 4 | 6 | 1 | 0 | 1 | 4 |
| 2022–23 | Chicago Blackhawks | NHL | 81 | 20 | 20 | 40 | 34 | — | — | — | — | — |
| 2023–24 | Chicago Blackhawks | NHL | 28 | 2 | 7 | 9 | 7 | — | — | — | — | — |
| 2024–25 | Chicago Blackhawks | NHL | 8 | 1 | 0 | 1 | 0 | — | — | — | — | — |
| 2024–25 | Rockford IceHogs | AHL | 30 | 11 | 16 | 27 | 18 | — | — | — | — | — |
| NHL totals | | | 495 | 128 | 118 | 246 | 189 | 15 | 2 | 0 | 2 | 6 |

=== International ===
| Year | Team | Event | Result | GP | G | A | Pts | PIM |
|---|---|---|---|---|---|---|---|---|
| 2011 | Canada Ontario | U17 | 1st place, gold medalist(s) | 5 | 2 | 3 | 5 | 2 |
| 2011 | Canada | IH18 | 1st place, gold medalist(s) | 5 | 3 | 1 | 4 | 0 |
| Junior totals | | | | 10 | 5 | 4 | 9 | 2 |

== Awards and honours ==
| Award | Year |
OHL
| Second All-Rookie Team | 2011 |
| CHL Top Prospects Game | 2012 |
International
| U17 Tournament All-Star Team | 2011 |
