= Matěj Psota =

Czech ice hockey player

- Born: January 24, 1994 (age 31); Liberec, Czech Republic
- Height: 5 ft 9 in (175 cm)
- Weight: 187 lb (85 kg; 13 st 5 lb)
- Position: Forward
- Shoots: Left
- Czech team: HC Bílí Tygři Liberec
- NHL draft: Undrafted
- Playing career: 2013–present

Matěj Psota (born January 24, 1994) is a Czech professional ice hockey player. He is currently playing with HC Bílí Tygři Liberec of the Czech Extraliga.

Psota made his Czech Extraliga debut playing with HC Bílí Tygři Liberec during the 2012–13 Czech Extraliga season.
