= Brandon Magee =

American football player (born 1990)

No. 58, 53
- Position: Linebacker

Personal information
- Born: October 22, 1990 (age 36); Harbor City, California, U.S.
- Listed height: 5 ft 11 in (1.80 m)
- Listed weight: 255 lb (116 kg)

Career information
- High school: Centennial (Corona, California)
- College: Arizona State
- NFL draft: 2013: undrafted

Career history
- Dallas Cowboys (2013)*; Cleveland Browns (2013); Tampa Bay Buccaneers (2014)
- * Offseason or practice squad member only

Awards and highlights
- Second-team All-Pac-12 (2012)

Career NFL statistics
- Games played: 17
- Total tackles: 12
- Stats at Pro Football Reference

Brandon Magee (born October 22, 1990) is an American former professional football player who was a linebacker in the National Football League (NFL). He played for the Dallas Cowboys, Cleveland Browns, and Tampa Bay Buccaneers. In Major League Baseball (MLB) he played for the Boston Red Sox organization. He also played college football and baseball for the Arizona State Sun Devils.

== Early life ==
Magee attended Centennial High School in Corona, California, where he was a four-year member of both the varsity baseball and football teams.

As a senior, he totaled 86 tackles (26 solo), averaging 7.2 tackles-per-game and led the team with 7.5 sacks. He led Centennial High School in sacks as a junior and as a senior.

During his high school career, Magee totaled 193 tackles (60 solo), 11.0 sacks, 7 quarterback hurries, 3 pass deflections and 2 fumble recoveries. He had 13 career games with seven or more tackles and eight games with more than 10.

He was listed as the No. 18 all-purpose athlete in the West region by ESPN Scouts, Inc. He was rated as the No. 4 weak side linebacker in the West region and the No. 21 weak side linebacker in the nation by scout.com. He was rated as the No. 26 outside linebacker in the country, the No. 3 linebacker in the state of California and the state's No. 44 overall player by rivals.com.

Magee was coached by Matt Logan at Centennial High School. During his high school career, Magee was a part of Centennial’s Varsity Football team as they claimed League Titles four consecutive seasons from 2004-2007, as well as CIF Southern Section Titles in 2004 and 2007.

He joined his high school teammate Shelly Lyons as member of ASU's 2008 signing class when they both committed to the Sun Devils in January 2008. He ultimately chose ASU over University of Arizona, Louisville, Nebraska, Tennessee and Washington State University.

== College career ==
Magee accepted a football scholarship from Arizona State University, where he was a double major in Education and Sociology. He was a four-year letterman at ASU where he played in 44 games over five years.

As a weakside linebacker, he accumulated 231 tackles (157 solo). He totaled 10 sacks for a loss of 85 total yards, and 24.5 tackles for losses with a net loss of 115 yards. He had three career interceptions and returned them a total of 56 yards, including one touchdown. Magee had one forced fumble, two fumble recoveries, and three pass deflections.

Magee continued to be a two-sport standout at ASU, as he also was an outfielder for the Sun Devil baseball team. During his college career, the team won consecutive Pac-12 titles and twice went to the College World Series.

== Professional career ==
=== Dallas Cowboys ===
Magee was signed as an undrafted free agent by the Dallas Cowboys after the 2013 NFL draft on April 28. The Cowboys gave him $70,000 in guaranteed money, more than any 2012 seventh-round draft pick. He compiled 16 tackles in the team’s first three exhibition games. He was cut at the conclusion of training camp on August 31.

=== Cleveland Browns ===
On September 1, 2013, he was claimed off waivers by the Cleveland Browns after his release from the Cowboys roster. He appeared in eight games as a special teams contributor. He was waived on July 23, 2014.

=== Tampa Bay Buccaneers ===
On July 24, 2014, Magee was claimed off waivers by the Tampa Bay Buccaneers. He was released on August 30 and signed to the practice squad. He was promoted to the active roster on September 15, before being placed on the injured reserve list with a torn pectoral muscle on December 8. He was waived on March 25, 2015.

== Baseball career ==
Brandon Magee

Boston Red Sox
- Outfielder
- Bats: Left Throws: Right

Magee was selected by the Boston Red Sox in the 23rd round of the 2012 Major League Baseball draft and signed with the team in July 2012. Magee was previously drafted by the Tampa Bay Rays in the 29th round in 2008 and by the Oakland Athletics in the 21st round in 2011.

He attended spring training with the Boston Red Sox in 2012, 2013 and 2014 while also playing in the NFL. Magee is the only two-sport professional NFL and MLB athlete in the 21st. century.

== Philanthropy ==
During high school, Magee volunteered for several years in the Corona, CA community along with his brother Angelo and his best friends as they hosted an array of functions for the teenaged population. After Magee's best friend Dominic Redd was murdered while walking home from school, Magee, his brother Angelo and his friends vowed to do all they could to keep their peers safe and off the streets by hosting events such as an annual Halloween party, talent shows and also assisted with the opening of two community youth centers in Corona entitled Mountain Top.

During his time at ASU, Magee visited more than 30 elementary schools across the Phoenix valley to talk to kids about overcoming obstacles, the importance of education and maintaining a positive mindset. He has also coordinated health fairs for local elementary school children and their families, as well as visited several hospitals, churches and other youth organizations in the Phoenix area. In addition, Magee has been to Canyon State Academy on several occasions to speak about the benefits of academic success and is an active member on ASU's campus.
