= Topi Nättinen =

Finnish ice hockey player

- Born: 1 April 1994 (age 30); Jyväskylä, Finland
- Height: 5 ft 10 in (178 cm)
- Weight: 179 lb (81 kg; 12 st 11 lb)
- Position: Left wing
- Shot: Left
- Played for: JYP Jyväskylä; Jukurit; SaiPa; TPS; HC Vita Hästen; Tappara
- Playing career: 2012–2021

Topi Nättinen (born 1 April 1994) is a Finnish former professional ice hockey player.

Nättinen made his SM-liiga debut playing with JYP Jyväskylä during the 2012–13 SM-liiga season. After his hockey career ended in 2021, he has worked in many roles including as a commentator for YLE and a player scout for Jokerit
