= Jan Schleiss =

Czech ice hockey player

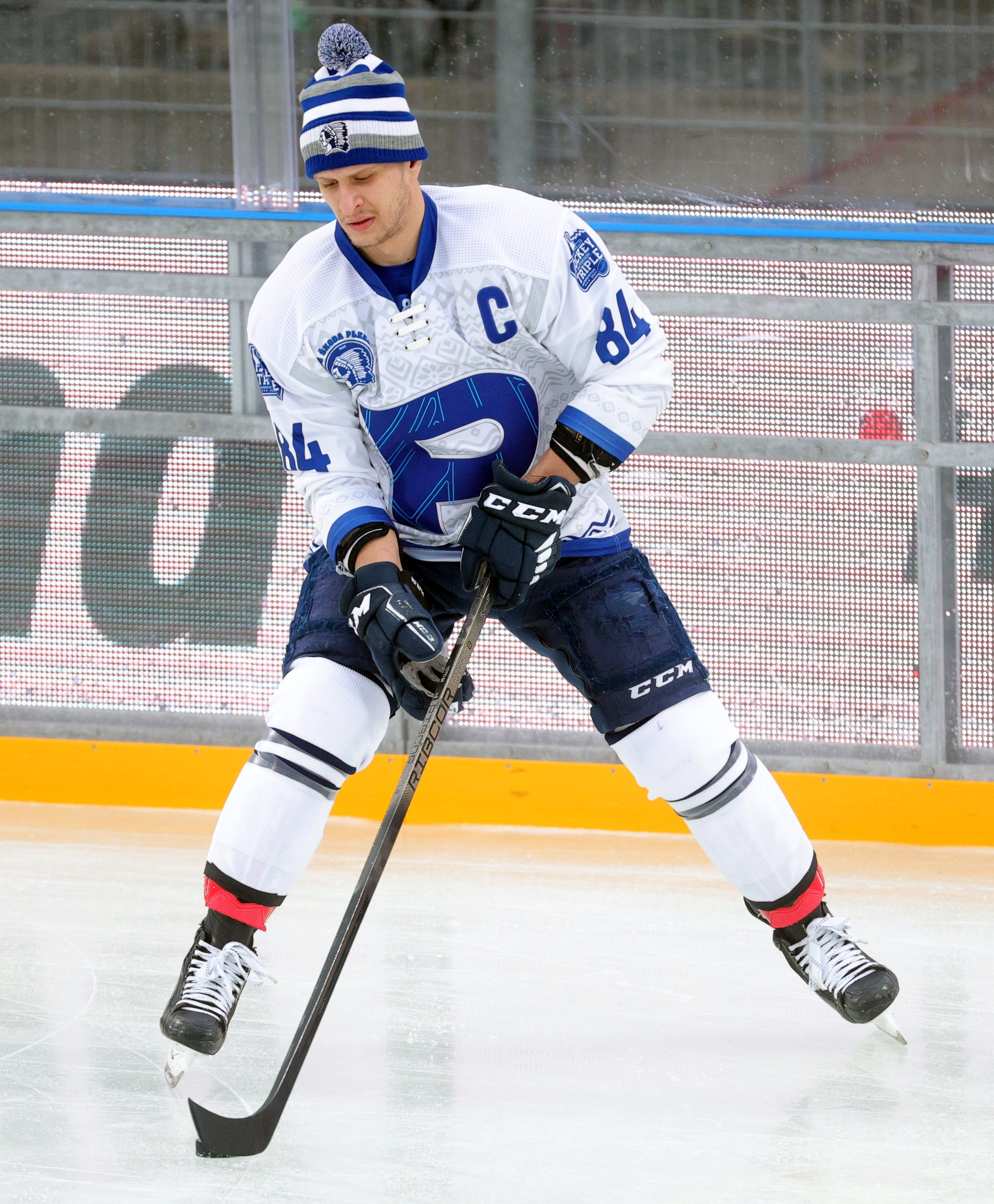
- Schleiss in 2024
- Born: September 1, 1994 (age 30); Plzeň, Czech Republic
- Height: 5 ft 9 in (175 cm)
- Weight: 178 lb (81 kg; 12 st 10 lb)
- Position: Forward
- Shoots: Right
- Czech team: HC Plzeň
- Playing career: 2012–present

Jan Schleiss (born September 1, 1994) is a Czech professional ice hockey player. He is currently playing for HC Plzeň of the Czech Extraliga.

Schleiss made his Czech Extraliga debut playing with HC Plzeň during the 2012-13 Czech Extraliga season.
