= Dominik Volek =

Czech ice hockey player

- Born: January 12, 1994 (age 31); Prague, Czech Republic
- Height: 6 ft 1 in (185 cm)
- Weight: 192 lb (87 kg; 13 st 10 lb)
- Position: Forward
- Shoots: Left
- Czech team: HC Sparta Praha
- Playing career: 2011–present

Dominik Volek (born January 12, 1994) is a Czech professional ice hockey player. He is currently playing for HC Sparta Praha of the Czech Extraliga.

Volek made his Czech Extraliga debut playing with HC Sparta Praha during the 2014–15 Czech Extraliga season. Volek is the son of former New York Islanders forward David Volek.
