= 2011 Ivan Hlinka Memorial Tournament =

Tournament details
- Host countries: Slovakia; Czech Republic
- Venue(s): 2 (in 2 host cities)
- Dates: August 8–13, 2011
- Teams: 8

Final positions
- Champions: Canada (16th title)
- Runner-up: Sweden
- Third place: Russia
- Fourth place: Finland

Tournament statistics
- Games played: 18
- Goals scored: 118 (6.56 per game)
- Scoring leader(s): (Finland) Teuvo Teräväinen (4 goals, 6 assists)

The 2011 Ivan Hlinka Memorial Tournament was an under-18 ice hockey tournament held in Břeclav, Czech Republic and Piešťany, Slovakia from August 8–13, 2011. As in 2010, the venues were Alcaplast Arena in Břeclav and Patrícia Ice Arena 37 in Piešťany. Canada won gold for the fourth consecutive year, defeating Sweden 4–1 in the final after losing to them 5–1 in their opening game. After their championship win, Canadian head coach Steve Spott attributed their success to a balanced attack in the absence of any one superstar.

== Preliminary round ==
=== Group A ===
Team	Pld	W	OTW	OTL	L	GF	GA	GD	Pts
Sweden	3	3	0	0	0	14	7	+7	9
Canada	3	2	0	0	1	13	6	+7	6
Czech Republic	3	1	0	0	2	7	12	−5	3
Switzerland	3	0	0	0	3	4	13	−9	0

=== Group B ===
Team	Pld	W	OTW	OTL	L	GF	GA	GD	Pts
Russia	3	2	0	1	0	12	8	+4	7
Finland	3	2	0	0	1	17	8	+9	6
United States	3	0	2	0	1	13	15	−2	4
Slovakia	3	0	0	1	2	9	20	−11	1

== Final round ==
=== Seventh place game ===
August 12, 2011	Switzerland	6–0	Slovakia	Patrícia Ice Arena 37

=== Fifth place game ===
August 12, 2011	Czech Republic	1–3	United States	Alcaplast Arena

=== Semifinal 1 ===
August 12, 2011	Canada	5–0 (1–0, 3–0, 1–0)	Russia	Patrícia Ice Arena 37

Game reference

Daniel Altshuller
Goalies
Andrei Vasilevskiy, Igor Ustinsky

Wilson (Laughton) - 19:00	1 – 0
Hudon (Rielly) - 22:39	2 – 0
Hudon (Gaunce, Maidens) - 26:33	3 – 0
Dumba (Hudon, Koekkoek) - 37:28	4 – 0
Pouliot (Athanasiou) - 41:31	5 – 0

=== Semifinal 2 ===
August 12, 2011	Sweden	4–3 (OT) (0–1, 2–0, 1–2, 1-0)	Finland	Alcaplast Arena

Game reference

	0 – 1	Ikonen (Vainon) - 7:42
Lindholm - 32:18	1 – 1
Burakowski (Pettersson) - 36:54	2 – 1
	2 – 2	Kulmala (Tikkanen, H. Ikonen) - 45:22
	2 – 3	H. Ikonen (Tikkanen, Lehtonen) - 50:46
Strömwall (Lindholm) - 53:19	3 - 3
Forsberg (Lindstom) - 63:56	4 - 3

=== Bronze medal game ===
August 13, 2011	Russia	2–1 (SO) (0–0, 1–1, 0–0, 0-0, 1-0)	Finland	Patrícia Ice Arena 37

Game reference

Kamaev (Ermakov) - 26:19	1 – 0
	1 – 1	J. Ikonen (Teräväinen) - 35:56
Kamaev - SO	2 – 1

=== Gold medal game ===
August 13, 2011	Canada	4–1 (1–0, 1–1, 2–0)	Sweden	Alcaplast Arena

Game reference

Daniel Altshuller
Goalies
Oscar Dansk

Monahan (Campagna) - 9:06	1 – 0
	1 – 1	Anderson (Karlsson, Collberg) - 33:07
Laughton - 36:26	2 – 1
Gaunce - 40:40	3 – 1
Hudon (Maidens, Gaunce) - 52:16	4 – 1

=== Final standings ===
Rk.	Team
1st place, gold medalist(s)	Canada
2nd place, silver medalist(s)	Sweden
3rd place, bronze medalist(s)	Russia
4.	Finland
5.	United States
6.	Czech Republic
7.	Switzerland
8.	Slovakia

== See also ==
- 2011 IIHF World U18 Championships
- 2011 World Junior Championships

Preceded by 2010 Ivan Hlinka Memorial Tournament	Ivan Hlinka Memorial Tournament; 2011	Succeeded by 2012 Ivan Hlinka Memorial Tournament
