= 2012–13 QMJHL season =

- League: Quebec Major Junior Hockey League
- Sport: Hockey
- Duration: Regular season September 20, 2012 – March 17, 2013; Playoffs; March 21, 2013 – May 10, 2013
- Teams: 18
- TV partner: Eastlink TV

Draft
- Top draft pick: Daniel Audette
- Picked by: Sherbrooke Phoenix

Regular Season
- Jean Rougeau Trophy: Halifax Mooseheads (1)
- Season MVP: Jonathan Drouin (Halifax Mooseheads)
- Top scorer: Ben Duffy (P.E.I. Rocket)

Playoffs
- Playoffs MVP: Jonathan Drouin (Mooseheads)
- Finals champions: Halifax Mooseheads
- Runners-up: Baie-Comeau Drakkar

QMJHL seasons
- 2011–12 2013–14

2012–13 CHL season
- League: Canadian Hockey League
- Sport: Ice hockey
- Duration: OHL; September 2012 – March 2013; QMJHL; September 2012 – March 2013; WHL; September 2012 – March 2013
- Teams: 60
- TV partner(s): RDS, Rogers Sportsnet, Rogers TV, Shaw TV
- Season MVP: Jonathan Drouin (Halifax Mooseheads) (QMHL)
- Top scorer: Brendan Leipsic (Portland Winterhawks) (WHL)

Memorial Cup
- Finals champions: Halifax Mooseheads (QMJHL) (1st title)
- Runners-up: Portland Winterhawks (WHL)

The 2012–13 QMJHL season was the 44th season of the Quebec Major Junior Hockey League (QMJHL). The regular season consisted of eighteen teams playing 68 games each, began on September 20, 2012, and ended on March 17, 2013. This was the Sherbrooke Phoenix's first season in the league.

== Regular season standings ==
Note: GP = Games played; W = Wins; L = Losses; OTL = Overtime losses; SL = Shootout losses; GF = Goals for; GA = Goals against; PTS = Points; x = clinched playoff berth; y = clinched division title

TELUS Maritimes Division	GP	W	L	OTL	SL	PTS	GF	GA	Rank
Halifax Mooseheads^{y}	68	58	6	3	1	120	347	176	1
Moncton Wildcats^{x}	68	42	23	2	1	87	274	202	6
P.E.I. Rocket^{x}	68	41	23	3	1	86	262	229	7
Acadie–Bathurst Titan^{x}	68	26	35	5	2	59	232	278	14
Saint John Sea Dogs^{x}	68	23	44	1	0	47	173	271	16
Cape Breton Screaming Eagles	68	14	46	3	5	36	161	308	18

TELUS East Division	GP	W	L	OTL	SL	PTS	GF	GA	Rank
Baie-Comeau Drakkar^{y}	68	44	19	2	3	93	274	191	2
Rimouski Océanic^{x}	68	41	18	3	6	91	264	223	4
Quebec Remparts^{x}	68	42	21	3	2	89	241	197	5
Victoriaville Tigres^{x}	68	32	27	3	6	73	234	226	11
Chicoutimi Saguenéens^{x}	68	30	31	2	5	67	198	225	12
Shawinigan Cataractes	68	15	46	5	2	37	154	284	17

TELUS West Division	GP	W	L	OTL	SL	PTS	GF	GA	Rank
Blainville-Boisbriand Armada^{y}	68	41	19	2	6	90	272	182	3
Rouyn-Noranda Huskies^{x}	68	40	24	1	3	84	283	255	8
Drummondville Voltigeurs^{x}	68	38	26	2	2	80	226	229	9
Val-d'Or Foreurs^{x}	68	35	27	0	6	76	274	254	10
Gatineau Olympiques^{x}	68	29	34	1	4	63	220	265	13
Sherbrooke Phoenix^{x}	68	21	38	3	6	51	188	282	15

== Scoring leaders ==
Note: GP = Games played; G = Goals; A = Assists; Pts = Points; PIM = Penalty minutes

Player	Team	GP	G	A	Pts	PIM
Ben Duffy	P.E.I. Rocket	68	39	71	110	4
Jonathan Drouin	Halifax Mooseheads	49	41	64	105	32
Josh Currie	P.E.I. Rocket	68	49	55	104	62
Peter Trainor	Rimouski Océanic	68	46	54	100	45
Dmitrij Jaškin	Moncton Wildcats	51	46	53	99	73
Sven Andrighetto	Rouyn-Noranda Huskies	53	31	67	98	45
Alexandre Lavoie	Cape Breton/Rimouski	63	36	60	96	50
Zach O'Brien	Acadie–Bathurst Titan	66	47	45	92	2
Anton Zlobin	Val-d'Or Foreurs	61	29	62	91	43
Anthony Mantha	Val-d'Or Foreurs	67	50	39	89	71

== Leading goaltenders ==
Note: GP = Games played; Mins = Minutes played; W = Wins; L = Losses: OTL = Overtime losses; SL = Shootout losses; GA = Goals Allowed; SO = Shutouts; GAA = Goals against average

Player	Team	GP	Mins	W	L	OTL	SL	GA	SO	Sv%	GAA
Étienne Marcoux	Blainville-Boisbriand Armada	42	2439	27	10	1	2	87	4	0.913	2.14
Zachary Fucale	Halifax Mooseheads	55	3161	45	5	2	1	124	2	0.909	2.35
François Brassard	Quebec Remparts	58	3292	33	18	2	2	150	2	0.909	2.73
Alex Dubeau	Moncton Wildcats	50	2820	30	15	1	0	129	4	0.899	2.74
Philippe Cadorette	Baie-Comeau Drakkar	50	2781	29	15	1	1	127	2	0.892	2.74

== 2013 President's Cup playoffs ==
Round 1
1	Halifax	4
16	Saint John	0
4	Rimouski	2
13	Gatineau	4
5	Quebec	4
12	Chicoutimi	2
8	Rouyn-Noranda	4
9	Drummondville	1
2	Baie-Comeau	4
15	Sherbrooke	0
6	Moncton	1
11	Victoriaville	4
3	Blainville-Boisbriand	4
14	Acadie–Bathurst	1
7	P.E.I.	2
10	Val-d'Or	4

Quarter-finals
1	Halifax	4
13	Gatineau	0
5	Quebec	1
8	Rouyn-Noranda	4
2	Baie-Comeau	4
11	Victoriaville	0
3	Blainville-Boisbriand	4
10	Val-d'Or	0

Semi-finals
1	Halifax	4
8	Rouyn-Noranda	0
2	Baie-Comeau	4
3	Blainville-Boisbriand	2

President's Cup Championship
1	Halifax	4
2	Baie-Comeau	1

== First round ==
=== (1) Halifax Mooseheads vs. (16) Saint John Sea Dogs ===
March 22	Halifax Mooseheads	11 – 1	Saint John Sea Dogs	Halifax Metro Centre	Recap
9:27 - pp - Nathan MacKinnon (1); 12:11 - Nathan MacKinnon (2)		First period	Jason Cameron (1) - 12:48
1:35 - pp - Stephen MacAulay (1); 2:18 - pp - Martin Frk (1); 7:43 - Martin Frk (2); 10:08 - Martin Frk (3); 11:10 - Brent Andrews (1); 14:00 - pp - Stefan Fournier (1); 16:35 - Martin Frk (4); 18:01 - Dominic Beauchemin (1)		Second period	No scoring
8:12 - Martin Frk (5)		Third period	No scoring
Zachary Fucale (18 saves / 19 shots)		Goalie stats	Sébastien Auger (31 saves / 38 shots); Alex Fournier (17 saves / 21 shots)

March 23	Halifax Mooseheads	2 – 1	Saint John Sea Dogs	Halifax Metro Centre	Recap
No scoring		First period	Maxime Villemaire (1) - pp - 14:01
0:25 - sh - Brent Andrews (2)		Second period	No scoring
12:42 - pp - Matthew Boudreau (1)		Third period	No scoring
Zachary Fucale (14 saves / 15 shots)		Goalie stats	Sébastien Auger (43 saves / 45 shots)

March 26	Saint John Sea Dogs	1 – 6	Halifax Mooseheads	Harbour Station	Recap
No scoring		First period	Stephen MacAulay (2) - 1:30; Andrew Ryan (1) - 17:33
8:08 - pp - Jurij Repe (1)		Second period	Martin Frk (6) - 3:13; Stephen MacAulay (3) - 4:20; Jonathan Drouin (1) - 11:16
No scoring		Third period	Jonathan Drouin (2) - sh - 5:41
Sébastien Auger (40 saves / 46 shots)		Goalie stats	Zachary Fucale (20 saves / 21 shots)

March 27	Saint John Sea Dogs	1 – 6	Halifax Mooseheads	Harbour Station	Recap
No scoring		First period	Stefan Fournier (2) - pp - 10:33; Nathan MacKinnon (3) - pp - 12:33
No scoring		Second period	Luca Ciampini (1) - 2:55; Matthew Boudreau (2) - 5:51; Darcy Ashley (1) - 19:20
7:33 - Maxime Villemaire (2)		Third period	Stefan Fournier (3) - 3:55
Sébastien Auger (44 saves / 50 shots)		Goalie stats	Zachary Fucale (14 saves / 15 shots)

Halifax wins series 4 – 0

=== (2) Baie-Comeau Drakkar vs. (15) Sherbrooke Phoenix ===
March 22	Baie-Comeau Drakkar	6 – 2	Sherbrooke Phoenix	Centre Henry-Leonard	Recap
0:17 - Carl Gélinas (1); 3:36 - Frédéric Gamelin (1); 16:05 - pp - Raphaël Bussières (1)		First period	Mike McNamee (1) - 0:28
0:56 - Félix Girard (1)		Second period	Denis Kamaev (1) - 7:50
6:19 - pp - Maxim Lamarche (1); 12:45 - pp - Carl Gélinas (2)		Third period	No scoring
Philippe Cadorette (18 saves / 20 shots)		Goalie stats	Jacob Gervais-Chouinard (43 saves / 49 shots)

March 23	Baie-Comeau Drakkar	8 – 1	Sherbrooke Phoenix	Centre Henry-Leonard	Recap
16:10 - Gabriel Verpaelst (1); 17:52 - Petr Straka (1); 19:45 - Raphaël Bussières (2)		First period	Carl Neill (1) - pp - 19:10
7:55 - pp - Raphaël Bussières (3); 9:04 - Gabryel Paquin-Boudreau (1); 16:07 - pp - Gabryel Paquin-Boudreau (2)		Second period	No scoring
3:27 - pp - Dominic Poulin (1); 7:22 - Petr Straka (2)		Third period	No scoring
Philippe Cadorette (26 saves / 27 shots)		Goalie stats	Jacob Gervais-Chouinard (27 saves / 32 shots); David Richer (12 saves / 15 shots)

March 26	Sherbrooke Phoenix	2 – 8	Baie-Comeau Drakkar	Palais des Sports	Recap
19:05 - Steve Lebel (1)		First period	Jérémy Grégoire (1) - sh - 13:51
11:02 - pp - Steve Lebel (2)		Second period	Valentin Zykov (1) - 0:56; Jérémy Grégoire (2) - 9:42
No scoring		Third period	Jérémy Grégoire (3) - 2:17; Félix Girard (2) - 3:12; Gabryel Paquin-Boudreau (3) - pp - 4:56; Frédéric Gamelin (2) - 7:30; Gabryel Paquin-Boudreau (4) - 12:19
Jacob Gervais-Chouinard (28 saves / 35 shots); David Richer (3 saves / 4 shots)		Goalie stats	Philippe Cadorette (28 saves / 30 shots)

March 27	Sherbrooke Phoenix	2 – 5	Baie-Comeau Drakkar	Palais des Sports	Recap
18:07 - Denis Kamaev (2)		First period	Valentin Zykov (2) - pp - 19:57
No scoring		Second period	Petr Straka (3) - 4:19
13:51 - Denis Kamaev (3)		Third period	Petr Straka (4) - pp - 3:44; Valentin Zykov (3) - pp - 4:17; Gabryel Paquin-Boudreau (5) - 11:33
Jacob Gervais-Chouinard (33 saves / 38 shots)		Goalie stats	Philippe Cadorette (16 saves / 18 shots)

Baie-Comeau wins series 4 – 0

=== (3) Blainville-Boisbriand Armada vs. (14) Acadie-Bathurst Titan ===
March 21	Blainville-Boisbriand Armada	6 – 1	Acadie-Bathurst Titan	Centre d'Excellence Sports Rousseau	Recap
19:14 - Christopher Clapperton (1)		First period	No scoring
8:21 - Marcus Hinds (1); 8:50 - Christopher Clapperton (2); 11:43 - Danick Martel (1); 14:12 - Olivier Picard (1)		Second period	No scoring
1:07 - Marc-Olivier Roy (1)		Third period	Christophe Lalancette (1) - 9:32
Étienne Marcoux (16 saves / 17 shots)		Goalie stats	Jacob Brennan (16 saves / 21 shots); Mason McDonald (11 saves / 12 shots)

March 22	Blainville-Boisbriand Armada	5 – 4	Acadie-Bathurst Titan	Centre d'Excellence Sports Rousseau	Recap
6:41 - pp - Philippe Sanche (1); 9:51 - pp - Cédric Paquette (1)		First period	Zach O'Brien (1) - 10:15; Christophe Lalancette (2) - 17:34
15:16 - Xavier Ouellet (1)		Second period	Zach O'Brien (2) - 2:24
2:42 - Philippe Sanche (2); 5:54 - Philippe Sanche (3)		Third period	Christophe Lalancette (3) - pp - 12:29
Étienne Marcoux (29 saves / 33 shots)		Goalie stats	Jacob Brennan (24 saves / 29 shots)

March 26	Acadie-Bathurst Titan	5 – 4	OT	Blainville-Boisbriand Armada	K. C. Irving Regional Centre	Recap
14:19 - Marc-Olivier Brouillard (1)		First period		Danick Martel (2) - 2:06
9:09 - Raphaël Lafontaine (1); 17:25 - Aidan Kelly (1)		Second period		Tommy Giroux (1) - 5:20
11:55 - pp - Zach O'Brien (3)		Third period		Stefan Matteau (1) - pp - 4:09; Philippe Sanche (4) - 6:31
5:32 - Zach O'Brien (3)		First overtime period		No scoring
Jacob Brennan (28 saves / 32 shots)		Goalie stats		Étienne Marcoux (18 saves / 23 shots)

March 27	Acadie-Bathurst Titan	1 – 4	Blainville-Boisbriand Armada	K. C. Irving Regional Centre	Recap
No scoring		First period	Marc-Olivier Roy (2) - pp - 9:51; Christopher Clapperton (3) - 14:59
No scoring		Second period	No scoring
6:07 - pp - Christophe Lalancette (4)		Third period	Tommy Giroux (2) - sh - 3:38; Tommy Giroux (3) - en - 18:43
Jacob Brennan (24 saves / 27 shots)		Goalie stats	Étienne Marcoux (30 saves / 31 shots)

March 29	Acadie-Bathurst Titan	2 – 3	Blainville-Boisbriand Armada	K. C. Irving Regional Centre	Recap
Raphaël Lafontaine (2) - 18:44		First period	No scoring
Matthew Bissonnette (1) - 13:26		Second period	9:53 - Marc-Olivier Roy (3); 17:48 - pp - Cédric Paquette (2)
No scoring		Third period	4:01 - Christopher Clapperton (4)
Jacob Brennan (34 saves / 37 shots)		Goalie stats	Étienne Marcoux (27 saves / 29 shots)

Blainville-Boisbriand wins series 4 – 1

=== (4) Rimouski Océanic vs. (13) Gatineau Olympiques ===
March 22	Rimouski Océanic	3 – 2	Gatineau Olympiques	Colisée de Rimouski	Recap
18:55 - Jean-François Plante (1)		First period	No scoring
14:11 - Alexandre Lavoie (1)		Second period	Gabriel Bourret (1) - pp - 18:23
4:26 - Anthony DeLuca (1)		Third period	Tomáš Hyka (1) - 7:16
Philippe Desrosiers (18 saves / 20 shots)		Goalie stats	Robert Steeves (27 saves / 30 shots)

March 23	Rimouski Océanic	3 – 5	Gatineau Olympiques	Colisée de Rimouski	Recap
17:04 - Alexandre Lavoie (2); 18:45 - Jean-François Plante (2)		First period	Martin Réway (1) - pp - 6:47; Jordan Kennedy (1) - 9:31
No scoring		Second period	Émile Poirier (1) - 12:44
7:34 - pp - Alexandre Lavoie (3)		Third period	Étienne Boutet (1) - 13:44; Rock Régimbald (1) - en - 18:54
Philippe Desrosiers (16 saves / 20 shots)		Goalie stats	Robert Steeves (19 saves / 22 shots)

March 26	Gatineau Olympiques	6 – 4	Rimouski Océanic	Robert Guertin Centre	Recap
8:57 - Émile Poirier (2); 15:58 - Jonathan Bourcier (1)		First period	Peter Trainor (1) - 3:20
13:48 - pp - Étienne Boutet (2)		Second period	No scoring
0:32 - pp - Émile Poirier (3); 7:27 - Jonathan Bourcier (2); 18:23 - Tomáš Hyka (2)		Third period	Samuel Morin (1) - pp - 2:27; Francis Beauvillier (1) - 3:22; Kevin Gagné (1) - pp - 18:56
Robert Steeves (23 saves / 27 shots)		Goalie stats	Robin Gusse (27 saves / 33 shots)

March 27	Gatineau Olympiques	4 – 0	Rimouski Océanic	Robert Guertin Centre	Recap
10:57 - Jordan Kennedy (2)		First period	No scoring
13:08 - Alexandre Carrier (1)		Second period	No scoring
9:53 - Rock Régimbald (2); 17:12 - Rock Régimbald (3)		Third period	No scoring
Robert Steeves (33 saves / 33 shots)		Goalie stats	Robin Gusse (17 saves / 21 shots)

March 29	Rimouski Océanic	2 – 1	Gatineau Olympiques	Colisée de Rimouski	Recap
19:32 - pp - Alexandre Lavoie (4)		First period	Étienne Boutet (3) - pp - 8:37
No scoring		Second period	No scoring
9:16 - Peter Trainor (2)		Third period	No scoring
Philippe Desrosiers (17 saves / 18 shots)		Goalie stats	Robert Steeves (17 saves / 19 shots)

March 31	Gatineau Olympiques	2 – 1	Rimouski Océanic	Robert Guertin Centre	Recap
14:12 - Émile Poirier (4)		First period	No scoring
3:10 - Simon Tardif-Richard (1)		Second period	No scoring
No scoring		Third period	Alexandre Lavoie (5) - pp - 9:37
Robert Steeves (26 saves / 27 shots)		Goalie stats	Philippe Desrosiers (23 saves / 25 shots)

Gatineau wins series 4 – 2

=== (5) Quebec Remparts vs. (12) Chicoutimi Saguenéens ===
March 22	Quebec Remparts	3 – 6	Chicoutimi Saguenéens	Colisée Pepsi	Recap
13:52 - Adam Erne (1)		First period	Thomas Gobeil (1) - 19:23
14:33 - Ryan Culkin (1)		Second period	Simon Tremblay (1) - 1:50; Guillaume Asselin (1) - pp - 16:03
13:23 - Anthony Duclair (1)		Third period	Laurent Dauphin (1) - 5:38; Simon Tremblay (2) - pp - 12:08; Guillaume Asselin (2) - en - 19:03
François Brassard (23 saves / 28 shots)		Goalie stats	Christopher Gibson (29 saves / 32 shots)

March 23	Quebec Remparts	5 – 1	Chicoutimi Saguenéens	Colisée Pepsi	Recap
No scoring		First period	No scoring
0:14 - pp - Nick Sörensen (1); 3:40 - pp - Nick Sörensen (2); 13:46 - Adam Erne (2)		Second period	No scoring
1:02 - Logan Shaw (1); 10:46 - Nick Sörensen (3)		Third period	Lukáš Sedlák (1) - pp - 17:23
François Brassard (19 saves / 20 shots); Zachary Fortin (2 saves / 2 shots)		Goalie stats	Christopher Gibson (27 saves / 32 shots)

March 26	Chicoutimi Saguenéens	3 – 6	Quebec Remparts	Centre Georges-Vézina	Recap
11:53 - Charles Hudon (1)		First period	Mikhail Grigorenko (1) - 0:20; Jason Houde (1) - 3:14
4:55 - Laurent Dauphin (2); 13:27 - Charles Hudon (2)		Second period	Logan Shaw (2) - 4:38; Nick Sörensen (4) - 18:12
No scoring		Third period	Alexandre Boivin (1) - 9:57; Nick Sörensen (5) - 11:15
Christopher Gibson (30 saves / 36 shots)		Goalie stats	François Brassard (26 saves / 29 shots)

March 27	Chicoutimi Saguenéens	0 – 4	Quebec Remparts	Centre Georges-Vézina	Recap
No scoring		First period	Nick Sörensen (6) - 5:23
No scoring		Second period	Jason Houde (2) - 9:47
No scoring		Third period	Jérémy Beaudry (1) - pp - 6:32; Mikhail Grigorenko (2) - pp - 13:44
Christopher Gibson (40 saves / 44 shots)		Goalie stats	François Brassard (32 saves / 32 shots)

March 29	Quebec Remparts	1 – 3	Chicoutimi Saguenéens	Colisée Pepsi	Recap
No scoring		First period	Sébastien Sylvestre (1) - 5:50
No scoring		Second period	Charles Hudon (3) - 5:02
2:23 - pp - Jérémy Beaudry (2)		Third period	Charles Hudon (4) - en - 19:10
François Brassard (25 saves / 27 shots)		Goalie stats	Christopher Gibson (39 saves / 40 shots)

March 31	Chicoutimi Saguenéens	3 – 4	OT	Quebec Remparts	Centre Georges-Vézina	Recap
18:07 - pp - Thomas Gobeil (2)		First period		Mikhail Grigorenko (3) - 3:47; Martin Lefebvre (1) - pp - 16:51
19:46 - pp - Charles Hudon (5)		Second period		Kurt Etchegary (1) - 1:57
0:28 - pp - Mathieu Gagnon (1)		Third period		No scoring
No scoring		First overtime period		Frédéric Bergeron (1) - 5:38
Christopher Gibson (38 saves / 42 shots)		Goalie stats		François Brassard (23 saves / 26 shots)

Quebec wins series 4 – 2

=== (6) Moncton Wildcats vs. (11) Victoriaville Tigres ===
March 22	Moncton Wildcats	0 – 3	Victoriaville Tigres	Moncton Coliseum	Recap
No scoring		First period	No scoring
No scoring		Second period	Angelo Miceli (1) - pp - 1:28
No scoring		Third period	Tommy Veilleux (1) - 1:50; Angelo Miceli (2) - 14:16
Alex Dubeau (26 saves / 29 shots)		Goalie stats	Brandon Whitney (37 saves / 37 shots)

March 23	Moncton Wildcats	3 – 2	OT	Victoriaville Tigres	Moncton Coliseum	Recap
0:47 - pp - Alex Saulnier (1)		First period		Philippe Halley (1) - 4:56
13:35 - Ivan Barbashev (1)		Second period		No scoring
No scoring		Third period		Philippe Halley (2) - pp - 14:34
16:58 - pp - Phillip Danault (1)		First overtime period		No scoring
Alex Dubeau (27 saves / 29 shots)		Goalie stats		Brandon Whitney (55 saves / 58 shots)

March 26	Victoriaville Tigres	6 – 5	OT	Moncton Wildcats	Colisée Desjardins	Recap
9:51 - Philippe Halley (3)		First period		Yannick Veilleux (1) - pp - 2:07
No scoring		Second period		Yannick Veilleux (2) - 10:48; Alex Saulnier (2) - ps - 18:02
7:37 - Philippe Hudon (1); 9:08 - pp - Philippe Hudon (2); 9:39 - Philippe Halley (4); 19:35 - Philippe Hudon (3)		Third period		Christophe Lalonde (1) - 5:42; Alex Saulnier (3) - 7:16
4:21 - Philippe Maillet (1)		First overtime period		No scoring
Brandon Whitney (38 saves / 43 shots)		Goalie stats		Alex Dubeau (25 saves / 31 shots)

March 27	Victoriaville Tigres	1 – 0	Moncton Wildcats	Colisée Desjardins	Recap
No scoring		First period	No scoring
No scoring		Second period	No scoring
18:17 - pp - Tristan Pomerleau (1)		Third period	No scoring
Brandon Whitney (33 saves / 33 shots)		Goalie stats	Alex Dubeau (18 saves / 19 shots)

March 29	Victoriaville Tigres	3 – 2	OT	Moncton Wildcats	Colisée Desjardins	Recap
Philippe Hudon (4) - 9:32; Philippe Hudon (5) - pp - 14:06		First period		2:20 - pp - Dmitrij Jaškin (1); 4:29 - Alex Saulnier (4)
No scoring		Second period		No scoring
No scoring		Third period		No scoring
Philippe Maillet (2) - 0:32		First overtime period		No scoring
Brandon Whitney (31 saves / 33 shots)		Goalie stats		Alex Dubeau (23 saves / 26 shots)

Victoriaville wins series 4 – 1

=== (7) P.E.I. Rocket vs. (10) Val-d'Or Foreurs ===
March 22	P.E.I. Rocket	3 – 2	OT	Val-d'Or Foreurs	Charlottetown Civic Centre	Recap
No scoring		First period		No scoring
11:47 - pp - Alexis Pépin (1)		Second period		Artem Sergeev (1) - pp - 15:45
14:26 - pp - Tomáš Pavelka (1)		Third period		Anthony Mantha (1) - 16:25
0:42 - Josh Currie (1)		First overtime period		No scoring
Antoine Bibeau (33 saves / 35 shots)		Goalie stats		Philippe Trudeau (33 saves / 36 shots)

March 23	P.E.I. Rocket	3 – 8	Val-d'Or Foreurs	Charlottetown Civic Centre	Recap
2:08 - Alex Micallef (1)		First period	Anton Zlobin (1) - pp - 4:58; Guillaume Gélinas (1) - 7:11
5:29 - pp - Jimmy Oligny (1)		Second period	Pierre-Maxime Poudrier (1) - 6:12; Anthony Mantha (2) - 6:51; Brandon Hynes (1) - 7:13; Brandon Hynes (2) - pp - 8:54; Anthony Mantha (3) - 12:23
14:47 - pp - Ben Duffy (1)		Third period	Pierre-Maxime Poudrier (2) - 1:49
Antoine Bibeau (17 saves / 24 shots); Maxime Lagacé (6 saves / 7 shots)		Goalie stats	Philippe Trudeau (38 saves / 41 shots)

March 26	Val-d'Or Foreurs	3 – 4	OT	P.E.I. Rocket	Centre Air Creebec	Recap
7:13 - Samuel Henley (1); 15:57 - sh - Loïk Poudrier (1)		First period		No scoring
No scoring		Second period		Victor Provencher (1) - pp - 1:28; Alex Micallef (2) - 6:28
1:33 - pp - Cédrick Henley (1)		Third period		Ben Duffy (2) - 16:00
No scoring		First overtime period		Matthew Bursey (1) - 1:23
Philippe Trudeau (40 saves / 44 shots)		Goalie stats		Antoine Bibeau (39 saves / 42 shots)

March 27	Val-d'Or Foreurs	3 – 0	P.E.I. Rocket	Centre Air Creebec	Recap
6:23 - pp - Anton Zlobin (2)		First period	No scoring
12:55 - pp - Loïk Poudrier (2)		Second period	No scoring
9:45 - Cédrick Henley (2)		Third period	No scoring
Philippe Trudeau (31 saves / 31 shots)		Goalie stats	Antoine Bibeau (34 saves / 37 shots)

March 29	Val-d'Or Foreurs	3 – 1	P.E.I. Rocket	Centre Air Creebec	Recap
No scoring		First period	6:46 - sh - Matthew Bursey (2)
Jérémie Fraser (1) - 3:56; Nicolas Aubé-Kubel (1) - 8:48		Second period	No scoring
Artem Sergeev (2) - sh - en - 19:18		Third period	No scoring
Philippe Trudeau (26 saves / 27 shots)		Goalie stats	Antoine Bibeau (29 saves / 31 shots)

April 1	P.E.I. Rocket	3 – 4	3OT	Val-d'Or Foreurs	Charlottetown Civic Centre	Recap
Yan-Pavel Laplante (1) - 10:34		First period		1:52 - Anthony Mantha (4); 8:31 - Brandon Hynes (3)
No scoring		Second period		0:47 - Anthony Mantha (5)
Yan Pavel Laplante (2) - 3:20; Yan Pavel Laplante (3) - 8:11		Third period		No scoring
No scoring		Third overtime period		1:03 - pp - Cédrick Henley (3)
Antoine Bibeau (54 saves / 58 shots)		Goalie stats		Philippe Trudeau (60 saves / 63 shots)

Val-d'Or Foreurs wins series 4 – 2

=== (8) Rouyn-Noranda Huskies vs. (9) Drummondville Voltigeurs ===
March 22	Rouyn-Noranda Huskies	4 – 2	Drummondville Voltigeurs	Aréna Iamgold	Recap
2:48 - Justin Guénette (1)		First period	Jérome Verrier (1) - pp - 5:57
No scoring		Second period	Nikolas Brouillard (1) - pp - 13:34
7:44 - pp - Jean-Sébastien Dea (1); 14:54 - Sven Andrighetto (1); 19:25 - pp - en - Maxime St-Cyr (1)		Third period	No scoring
Alexandre Bélanger (21 saves / 23 shots)		Goalie stats	Louis-Philip Guindon (31 saves / 34 shots)

March 23	Rouyn-Noranda Huskies	3 – 2	Drummondville Voltigeurs	Aréna Iamgold	Recap
No scoring		First period	No scoring
12:52 - Sven Andrighetto (2)		Second period	Guillaume Gauthier (1) - 1:20
7:09 - Redgie Bois (1); 17:26 - Dillon Fournier (1)		Third period	Matthew Boudens (1) - 3:22
Alexandre Bélanger (27 saves / 29 shots)		Goalie stats	Louis-Philip Guindon (27 saves / 30 shots)

March 26	Drummondville Voltigeurs	7 – 6	Rouyn-Noranda Huskies	Centre Marcel Dionne	Recap
4:24 - Nikolas Brouillard (2); 8:54 - Matthew Boudens (2); 9:25 - pp - Matthew Boudens (3)		First period	Jean-Sébastien Dea (2) - pp - 17:07
0:55 - sh - Matthew Boudens (4); 5:42 - Olivier Archambault (1); 6:18 - Lukas Balmelli (1)		Second period	Mathieu Brisebois (1) - pp - 2:31
7:26 - Matthew Boudens (5)		Third period	Sven Andrighetto (3) - pp - 5:40; Mathieu Brisebois (2) - pp - 14:36; Justin Guénette (2) - 16:15; Jean-Sébastien Dea (3) - 18:59
Louis-Philip Guindon (21 saves / 27 shots)		Goalie stats	Alexandre Bélanger (14 saves / 20 shots); Philippe Gingras (11 saves / 12 shots)

March 27	Drummondville Voltigeurs	3 – 4	OT	Rouyn-Noranda Huskies	Centre Marcel Dionne	Recap
0:24 - Gabriel Vermette (1); 13:38 - pp - Jérome Verrier (2)		First period		No scoring
No scoring		Second period		Gabriel Desjardins (1) - pp - 8:53; Sven Andrighetto (4) - sh - 19:18
3:32 - pp - Matthew Boudens (6)		Third period		Dillon Fournier (2) - 17:43
No scoring		First overtime period		Nikita Kucherov (1) - 7:43
Louis-Philip Guindon (30 saves / 34 shots)		Goalie stats		Alexandre Bélanger (30 saves / 33 shots)

March 29	Rouyn-Noranda Huskies	6 – 4	Drummondville Voltigeurs	Aréna Iamgold	Recap
16:40 - pp - Jean-Sébastien Dea (4)		First period	Guillaume Gauthier (2) - pp - 3:09; Gabriel Vermette (2) - 4:43; Matthew Boudens (7) - 13:01
2:31 - Jean-Sébastien Dea (5); 3:09 - Nikita Kucherov (2); 3:25 - Sven Andrighetto (5); 4:13 - Nikita Kucherov (3)		Second period	Olivier Archambault (2) - 9:40
15:45 - Jean-Sébastien Dea (6)		Third period	No scoring
Alexandre Bélanger (15 saves / 19 shots)		Goalie stats	Louis-Philip Guindon (13 saves / 17 shots); Domenic Graham (16 saves / 18 shots)

Rouyn-Noranda wins series 4 – 1

== Quarter-finals ==
=== (1) Halifax Mooseheads Vs. (13) Gatineau Olympiques ===
April 5	Halifax Mooseheads	7 – 0	Gatineau Olympiques	Halifax Metro Centre	Recap
2:23 - sh - Stephen MacAulay (4); 7:39 - pp - Konrad Abeltshauser (1); 15:43 - pp - Stefan Fournier (4); 19:19 - pp - Matthew Boudreau (3)		First period	No scoring
1:32 - Jonathan Drouin (3); 15:57 - pp - Stefan Fournier (5)		Second period	No scoring
12:50 - pp - Darcy Ashley (2)		Third period	No scoring
Zachary Fucale (20 saves / 20 shots)		Goalie stats	Robert Steeves (19 saves / 25 shots); Eric Brassard (5 saves / 6 shots)

April 6	Halifax Mooseheads	5 – 0	Gatineau Olympiques	Halifax Metro Centre	Recap
6:47 - Andrew Ryan (2); 18:29 - Stefan Fournier (6)		First period	No scoring
No scoring		Second period	No scoring
10:17 - Luca Ciampini (2); 12:03 - Stephen MacAulay (5); 18:41 - Brent Andrews (3)		Third period	No scoring
Zachary Fucale (13 saves / 13 shots)		Goalie stats	Robert Steeves (33 saves / 38 shots)

April 9	Gatineau Olympiques	2 – 4	Halifax Mooseheads	Robert Guertin Centre	Recap
6:52 - Émile Poirier (5)		First period	Darcy Ashley (3) - 2:25; Matthew Boudreau (4) - 7:43; Stefan Fournier (7) - pp - 16:44
8:09 - Émile Poirier (6)		Second period	No scoring
No scoring		Third period	Stefan Fournier (8) - sh - en - 19:46
Robert Steeves (29 saves / 32 shots)		Goalie stats	Zachary Fucale (15 saves / 17 shots)

April 10	Gatineau Olympiques	3 – 5	Halifax Mooseheads	Robert Guertin Centre	Recap
6:30 - Simon Tardif-Richard (2)		First period	Konrad Abeltshauser (2) - pp - 3:28; Stefan Fournier (9) - 14:09
No scoring		Second period	Stefan Fournier (10) - 11:30
6:02 - Mikael Langlois (1); 9:39 - Jordan Kennedy (3)		Third period	Stefan Fournier (11) - 6:20; Jonathan Drouin (4) - en - 19:33
Robert Steeves (29 saves / 33 shots)		Goalie stats	Zachary Fucale (21 saves / 24 shots)

Halifax wins series 4 – 0

=== (2) Baie-Comeau Drakkar Vs. (11) Victoriaville Tigres ===
April 5	Baie-Comeau Drakkar	5 – 3	Victoriaville Tigres	Centre Henry-Leonard	Recap
6:58 - Dominic Poulin (2); 18:34 - Petr Straka (5)		First period	Carl-Antoine Delisle (1) - pp - 6:36; Michael Rhéaume (1) - 15:57
10:16 - Gabriel Verpaelst (2); 14:01 - ps - Jérémy Grégoire (4)		Second period	Philippe Hudon (6) - pp - 12:20
11:56 - Jérémy Grégoire (5)		Third period	No scoring
Philippe Cadorette (15 saves / 18 shots)		Goalie stats	Brandon Whitney (33 saves / 38 shots)

April 6	Baie-Comeau Drakkar	6 – 2	Victoriaville Tigres	Centre Henry-Leonard	Recap
3:02 - pp - Jérémy Grégoire (6); 13:26 - Petr Straka (6)		First period	Carl-Antoine Delisle (2) - pp - 7:41
8:26 - pp - Gabryel Paquin-Boudreau (6); 13:04 - Jérémy Grégoire (7); 15:00 - Alexandre Chênevert (1); 15:55 - Petr Straka (7)		Second period	No scoring
No scoring		Third period	Angelo Miceli (3) - pp - 14:36
Philippe Cadorette (28 saves / 30 shots)		Goalie stats	Brandon Whitney (25 saves / 31 shots); Steven Veilleux (13 saves / 13 shots)

April 8	Victoriaville Tigres	0 – 3	Baie-Comeau Drakkar	Colisée Desjardins	Recap
No scoring		First period	Petr Straka (8) - pp - 8:30
No scoring		Second period	Jérémy Grégoire (8) - 9:33
No scoring		Third period	Samuel Noreau (1) - pp - 18:14
Brandon Whitney (41 saves / 44 shots)		Goalie stats	Philippe Cadorette (22 saves / 22 shots)

April 10	Victoriaville Tigres	1 – 2	Baie-Comeau Drakkar	Colisée Desjardins	Recap
No scoring		First period	Carl Gélinas (3) - 19:38
18:38 - William Cochrane (1)		Second period	No scoring
No scoring		Third period	Maxim Lamarche (2) - 12:54
Brandon Whitney (41 saves / 43 shots)		Goalie stats	Philippe Cadorette (19 saves / 20 shots)

Baie-Comeau wins series 4 – 0

=== (3) Blainville-Boisbriand Armada Vs. (10) Val-d'Or Foreurs ===
April 5	Blainville-Boisbriand Armada	10 – 1	Val-d'Or Foreurs	Centre d'Excellence Sports Rousseau	Recap
1:07 - Marc-Olivier Roy (4); 6:42 - pp - Cédric Paquette (3)		First period	Brandon Hynes (4) - pp - 14:56
1:03 - pp - Samuel Carrier (1); 6:29 - Ņikita Jevpalovs (1); 11:34 - sh - Cédric Paquette (4); 15:59 - pp - Ņikita Jevpalovs (2); 18:27 - pp - Marc-Olivier Roy (5)		Second period	No scoring
6:11 - pp - Tommy Giroux (4); 7:14 - Robert MacKenzie (1); 11:19 - Tommy Giroux (5)		Third period	No scoring
Étienne Marcoux (16 saves / 17 shots)		Goalie stats	Philippe Trudeau (15 saves / 19 shots); François Tremblay (17 saves / 23 shots)

April 6	Blainville-Boisbriand Armada	5 – 4	Val-d'Or Foreurs	Centre d'Excellence Sports Rousseau	Recap
11:37 - Cédric Paquette (5)		First period	No scoring
9:06 - pp - Christopher Clapperton (5); 10:19 - Danick Martel (3)		Second period	Loïk Poudrier (3) - 4:58; Artem Sergeev (3) - 12:29; Randy Gazzola (1) - 16:11
5:41 - Cédric Paquette (6); 11:15 - pp - Stefan Matteau (2)		Third period	Pierre-Maxime Poudrier (3) - 4:36
Étienne Marcoux (20 saves / 24 shots)		Goalie stats	Philippe Trudeau (29 saves / 34 shots)

April 9	Val-d'Or Foreurs	0 – 5	Blainville-Boisbriand Armada	Centre Air Creebec	Recap
No scoring		First period	Xavier Ouellet (2) - pp - 10:21; Yasin Cissé (1) - 13:14
No scoring		Second period	Xavier Ouellet (3) - pp - 9:51
No scoring		Third period	Stefan Matteau (3) - 2:26; Cédric Paquette (7) - 6:15
Philippe Trudeau (24 saves / 28 shots); François Tremblay (5 saves / 6 shots)		Goalie stats	Étienne Marcoux (23 saves / 23 shots)

April 10	Val-d'Or Foreurs	1 – 2	Blainville-Boisbriand Armada	Centre Air Creebec	Recap
No scoring		First period	Philippe Sanche (5) - 9:27; Tommy Giroux (6) - pp - 15:37
8:36 - pp - Brandon Hynes (5)		Second period	No scoring
No scoring		Third period	No scoring
Philippe Trudeau (31 saves / 33 shots)		Goalie stats	Étienne Marcoux (27 saves / 28 shots)

Blainville-Boisbriand wins series 4 – 0

=== (5) Quebec Remparts Vs. (8) Rouyn-Noranda Huskies ===
April 5	Quebec Remparts	1 – 6	Rouyn-Noranda Huskies	Colisée Pepsi	Recap
17:55 - Adam Erne (3)		First period	Nikita Kucherov (4) - 2:46; Maxime St-Cyr (2) - 14:21
No scoring		Second period	Maxime St-Cyr (3) - 8:29; Gabriel Slight (1) - pp - 16:03
No scoring		Third period	Gabriel Desjardins (2) - sh - en - 14:32; Gabriel Slight (2) - 19:29
François Brassard (22 saves / 26 shots); Zachary Fortin (4 saves / 5 shots)		Goalie stats	Alexandre Bélanger (25 saves / 26 shots)

April 6	Quebec Remparts	4 – 2	Rouyn-Noranda Huskies	Colisée Pepsi	Recap
No scoring		First period	No scoring
11:36 - Logan Shaw (3); 16:53 - Marc-Antoine Carrier (1)		Second period	Gabriel Desjardins (3) - 0:31
6:51 - pp - Adam Erne (4); 18:36 - en - Adam Erne (5)		Third period	Gabriel Desjardins (4) - 19:30
François Brassard (30 saves / 32 shots)		Goalie stats	Alexandre Bélanger (29 saves / 32 shots)

April 9	Rouyn-Noranda Huskies	5 – 2	Quebec Remparts	Aréna Iamgold	Recap
4:09 - pp - Sven Andrighetto (6)		First period	Ryan Culkin (2) - 2:18; Kurt Etchegary (2) - sh - 12:17
No scoring		Second period	No scoring
0:40 - Marcus Power (1); 4:19 - sh - Dillon Fournier (3); 8:09 - pp - Jean-Sébastien Dea (7); 19:12 - en - Liam O'Brien (1)		Third period	No scoring
Alexandre Bélanger (21 saves / 23 shots)		Goalie stats	François Brassard (29 saves / 33 shots)

April 10	Rouyn-Noranda Huskies	5 – 4	OT	Quebec Remparts	Aréna Iamgold	Recap
8:04 - pp - Gabriel Desjardins (5)		First period		Anthony Duclair (2) - 3:56; Nick Sörensen (7) - pp - 17:50; Mikhail Grigorenko (4) - pp - 19:50
5:57 - pp - Jean-Sébastien Dea (8); 8:47 - pp - Gabriel Desjardins (6)		Second period		Anthony Duclair (3) - 19:37
8:31 - Liam O'Brien (2)		Third period		No scoring
2:49 - Marcus Power (2)		First overtime period		No scoring
Alexandre Bélanger (28 saves / 32 shots)		Goalie stats		François Brassard (30 saves / 35 shots)

April 12	Rouyn-Noranda Huskies	6 – 1	Quebec Remparts	Aréna Iamgold	Recap
Nikita Kucherov (5) - pp - 3:22; Mathieu Brisebois (3) - pp - 15:59		First period	No scoring
Nikita Kucherov (6) - 11:33		Second period	14:24 - Mikhail Grigorenko (5)
Jean-Sébastien Dea (9) - 3:38; Nikita Kucherov (7) - 6:09; Jean-Sébastien Dea (10) - 16:18		Third period	No scoring
Alexandre Bélanger (14 saves / 15 shots)		Goalie stats	François Brassard (33 saves / 39 shots)

Rouyn-Noranda wins series 4 – 1

== Semi-finals ==
=== (1) Halifax Mooseheads Vs. (8) Rouyn-Noranda Huskies ===
April 20	Halifax Mooseheads	6 – 4	Rouyn-Noranda Huskies	Halifax Metro Centre	Recap
1:15 - pp - Martin Frk (7); 10:28 - Nathan MacKinnon (4)		First period	Nikita Kucherov (8) - 19:31
7:38 - ps - Jonathan Drouin (5); 15:46 - Nathan MacKinnon (5)		Second period	Nikita Kucherov (9) - 0:38; Jean-Sébastien Dea (11) - pp - 17:18
8:58 - Jonathan Drouin (6); 19:30 - pp - en - Nathan MacKinnon (6)		Third period	Sven Andrighetto (7) - pp - 1:26
Zachary Fucale (27 saves / 31 shots)		Goalie stats	Alexandre Bélanger (23 saves / 28 shots)

April 21	Halifax Mooseheads	5 – 4	OT	Rouyn-Noranda Huskies	Halifax Metro Centre	Recap
1:09 - sh - Jonathan Drouin (7); 12:04 - pp - Martin Frk (8)		First period		Marcus Power (3) - 3:45; Maxime St-Cyr (4) - 9:13; Jean-Sébastien Dea (12) - 16:40; Sven Andrighetto (8) - pp - 18:43
No scoring		Second period		No scoring
2:58 - pp - Nathan MacKinnon (7); 13:19 - Andrew Ryan (3)		Third period		No scoring
7:12 - pp - Martin Frk (9)		First overtime period		No scoring
Zachary Fucale (20 saves / 24 shots)		Goalie stats		Alexandre Bélanger (30 saves / 35 shots)

April 23	Rouyn-Noranda Huskies	2 – 3	OT	Halifax Mooseheads	Aréna Iamgold	Recap
No scoring		First period		No scoring
9:01 - Marcus Power (4)		Second period		Konrad Abeltshauser (3) - 11:12
16:08 - Francis Perron (1)		Third period		Stefan Fournier (12) - 11:10
No scoring		First overtime period		Jonathan Drouin (8) - 16:01
Alexandre Bélanger (46 saves / 49 shots)		Goalie stats		Zachary Fucale (22 saves / 24 shots)

April 25	Rouyn-Noranda Huskies	6 – 9	Halifax Mooseheads	Aréna Iamgold	Recap
0:35 - Gabriel Desjardins (7)		First period	Martin Frk (10) - 0:42; Brent Andrews (4) - 1:07
0:59 - Dillon Fournier (4); 13:37 - Gabriel Desjardins (8); 13:54 - Maxime St-Cyr (5)		Second period	Konrad Abeltshauser (4) - 7:19; Jonathan Drouin (9) - 8:39; Stefan Fournier (13) - 16:15
8:48 - Marcus Power (5); 19:24 - Gabriel Desjardins (9)		Third period	Nathan MacKinnon (8) - 0:46; Nathan MacKinnon (9) - pp - 1:33; Martin Frk (11) - 8:21; Jonathan Drouin (10) - 11:53
Alexandre Bélanger (17 saves / 25 shots); Philippe Gingras (4 saves / 5 shots)		Goalie stats	Zachary Fucale (30 saves / 36 shots)

Halifax wins series 4 – 0

=== (2) Baie-Comeau Drakkar Vs. (3) Blainville-Boisbriand Armada ===
April 19	Baie-Comeau Drakkar	2 – 1	Blainville-Boisbriand Armada	Centre Henry-Leonard	Recap
1:06 - pp - Jérémy Grégoire (9)		First period	No scoring
No scoring		Second period	No scoring
7:46 - pp - Valentin Zykov (4)		Third period	Christian Marti (1) - 0:45
Philippe Cadorette (33 saves / 34 shots)		Goalie stats	Étienne Marcoux (31 saves / 33 shots)

April 20	Baie-Comeau Drakkar	2 – 1	Blainville-Boisbriand Armada	Centre Henry-Leonard	Recap
9:21 - Raphaël Bussières (4)		First period	No scoring
18:46 - Maxim Lamarche (3)		Second period	Marc-Olivier Roy (6) - pp - 5:57
No scoring		Third period	No scoring
Philippe Cadorette (22 saves / 23 shots)		Goalie stats	Étienne Marcoux (31 saves / 33 shots)

April 23	Blainville-Boisbriand Armada	3 – 0	Baie-Comeau Drakkar	Centre d'Excellence Sports Rousseau	Recap
11:02 - pp - Xavier Ouellet (4)		First period	No scoring
2:13 - Ryan Tesink (1)		Second period	No scoring
2:47 - Christopher Clapperton (6)		Third period	No scoring
Étienne Marcoux (17 saves / 17 shots)		Goalie stats	Philippe Cadorette (33 saves / 36 shots)

April 24	Blainville-Boisbriand Armada	4 – 3	Baie-Comeau Drakkar	Centre d'Excellence Sports Rousseau	Recap
7:24 - pp - Xavier Ouellet (5); 10:13 - Marcus Hinds (2)		First period	No scoring
15:44 - Xavier Ouellet (6)		Second period	Valentin Zykov (5) - 8:30; Carl Gélinas (4) - 10:16
4:56 - Xavier Ouellet (7)		Third period	Félix Girard (3) - 1:37
Étienne Marcoux (27 saves / 30 shots)		Goalie stats	Philippe Cadorette (23 saves / 27 shots)

April 26	Baie-Comeau Drakkar	2 – 1	OT	Blainville-Boisbriand Armada	Centre Henry-Leonard	Recap
No scoring		First period		No scoring
No scoring		Second period		Ņikita Jevpalovs (3) - 16:59
19:25 - Petr Straka (9)		Third period		No scoring
2:55 - Valentin Zykov (6)		First overtime period		No scoring
Simon Lemieux (29 saves / 30 shots)		Goalie stats		Storm Phaneuf (20 saves / 21 shots); Marc-Antoine Turcotte (6 saves / 7 shots)

April 28	Blainville-Boisbriand Armada	0 – 4	Baie-Comeau Drakkar	Centre d'Excellence Sports Rousseau	Recap
No scoring		First period	Gabryel Paquin-Boudreau (7) - 9:32; Alexandre Ranger (1) - 10:38
No scoring		Second period	Félix Girard (4) - 17:07
No scoring		Third period	Valentin Zykov (7) - pp - 2:22
Étienne Marcoux (31 saves / 35 shots)		Goalie stats	Philippe Cadorette (24 saves / 24 shots)

Baie-Comeau wins series 4 – 2

== Presidents Cup Finals ==
=== (1) Halifax Mooseheads Vs. (2) Baie-Comeau Drakkar ===
May 3	Halifax Mooseheads	4 – 0	Baie-Comeau Drakkar	Halifax Metro Centre	Recap
No scoring		First period	No scoring
16:20 - pp - Konrad Abeltshauser (5)		Second period	No scoring
5:52 - Trey Lewis (1); 14:46 - Ryan Falkenham (1); 18:55 - en - Stefan Fournier (14)		Third period	No scoring
Zachary Fucale (28 saves / 28 shots)		Goalie stats	Philippe Cadorette (30 saves / 33 shots)

May 4	Halifax Mooseheads	4 – 3	Baie-Comeau Drakkar	Halifax Metro Centre	Recap
11:49 - Stephen MacAulay (6); 16:02 - Konrad Abeltshauser (6); 15:48 - pp - Stefan Fournier (15)		First period	No scoring
19:54 - pp - Matthew Boudreau (5)		Second period	Valentin Zykov (8) - 16:37
No scoring		Third period	Carl Gélinas (5) - 18:27; Petr Straka (10) - 19:58
Zachary Fucale (28 saves / 31 shots)		Goalie stats	Philippe Cadorette (16 saves / 20 shots); Francis Desrosiers (7 saves / 7 shots)

May 7	Baie-Comeau Drakkar	3 – 1	Halifax Mooseheads	Centre Henry-Leonard	Recap
No scoring		First period	No scoring
15:50 - Valentin Zykov (9)		Second period	No scoring
2:49 - Gabryel Paquin-Boudreau (8); 19:02 - en - Carl Gélinas (6)		Third period	Andrew Ryan (4) - 10:17
Philippe Cadorette (27 saves / 28 shots)		Goalie stats	Zachary Fucale (27 saves / 29 shots)

May 8	Baie-Comeau Drakkar	4 – 7	Halifax Mooseheads	Centre Henry-Leonard	Recap
18:28 - pp - Samuel Noreau (2)		First period	No scoring
1:30 - Petr Straka (11); 8:41 - Carl Gélinas (7)		Second period	Jonathan Drouin (11) - 7:08; Martin Frk (12) - 7:23; Martin Frk (13) - pp - 10:29; Andrew Ryan (5) - 11:01; Nathan MacKinnon (10) - 13:54; Trey Lewis (2) - 19:08
6:11 - Gabryel Paquin-Boudreau (9)		Third period	Konrad Abeltshauser (7) - 4:50
Philippe Cadorette (11 saves / 16 shots); Francis Desrosiers (9 saves / 11 shots)		Goalie stats	Zachary Fucale (39 saves / 43 shots)

May 10	Halifax Mooseheads	5 – 1	Baie-Comeau Drakkar	Halifax Metro Centre	Recap
5:32 - pp - Stephen MacAulay (7); 13:19 - pp - Stefan Fournier (16); 15:08 - Jonathan Drouin (12)		First period	No scoring
No scoring		Second period	Valentin Zykov (10) - pp - 13:10
13:52 - Nathan MacKinnon (11); 18:41 - en - Stephen MacAulay (8)		Third period	No scoring
Zachary Fucale (34 saves / 35 shots)		Goalie stats	Philippe Cadorette (25 saves / 29 shots)

Halifax wins series 4 – 1

== Playoff scoring leaders ==
Note: GP = Games played; G = Goals; A = Assists; Pts = Points; PIM = Penalty minutes

Player	Team	GP	G	A	Pts	PIM
Jonathan Drouin	Halifax Mooseheads	17	12	23	35	14
Martin Frk	Halifax Mooseheads	17	13	20	33	32
Nathan MacKinnon	Halifax Mooseheads	17	11	22	33	12
Sven Andrighetto	Rouyn-Noranda Huskies	14	8	22	30	14
Stefan Fournier	Halifax Mooseheads	17	16	13	29	31
Petr Straka	Baie-Comeau Drakkar	19	11	14	25	12
Nikita Kucherov	Rouyn-Noranda Huskies	14	9	15	24	10
Jean-Sébastien Dea	Rouyn-Noranda Huskies	14	12	9	21	24
Carl Gélinas	Baie-Comeau Drakkar	19	7	14	21	12
Stephen MacAulay	Halifax Mooseheads	16	8	12	20	24
Konrad Abeltshauser	Halifax Mooseheads	17	7	13	20	12
Christopher Clapperton	Blainville-Boisbriand Armada	15	6	14	20	20

== Playoff leading goaltenders ==
Note: GP = Games played; Mins = Minutes played; W = Wins; L = Losses: OTL = Overtime losses; SL = Shootout losses; GA = Goals Allowed; SO = Shutouts; GAA = Goals against average

Player	Team	GP	Mins	W	L	GA	SO	Sv%	GAA
Zachary Fucale	Halifax Mooseheads	17	1041	16	1	35	3	0.918	2.02
Étienne Marcoux	Blainville-Boisbriand Armada	14	843	10	4	30	2	0.920	2.13
Philippe Desrosiers	Rimouski Océanic	4	238	2	2	9	0	0.892	2.26
Philippe Cadorette	Baie-Comeau Drakkar	18	1030	12	6	39	2	0.914	2.27
Alex Dubeau	Moncton Wildcats	5	318	1	4	15	0	0.888	2.83

== Trophies and awards ==
Team

- President's Cup - Playoff Champions: Halifax Mooseheads
- Jean Rougeau Trophy - Regular Season Champions: Halifax Mooseheads
- Luc Robitaille Trophy - Team that scored the most goals: Halifax Mooseheads
- Robert Lebel Trophy - Team with best GAA: Halifax Mooseheads

Player

- Michel Brière Memorial Trophy - Most Valuable Player: Jonathan Drouin, Halifax Mooseheads
- Jean Béliveau Trophy - Top Scorer: Ben Duffy, P.E.I. Rocket
- Guy Lafleur Trophy - Playoff MVP: Jonathan Drouin, Halifax Mooseheads
- Jacques Plante Memorial Trophy - Top Goaltender: Étienne Marcoux, Blainville-Boisbriand Armada
- Guy Carbonneau Trophy - Best Defensive Forward: Félix Girard, Baie-Comeau Drakkar
- Emile Bouchard Trophy - Defenceman of the Year: Kevin Gagné, Rimouski Océanic/Saint John Sea Dogs
- Kevin Lowe Trophy - Best Defensive Defenceman:
- Mike Bossy Trophy - Top Prospect: Jonathan Drouin, Halifax Mooseheads
- RDS Cup - Rookie of the Year: Valentin Zykov, Baie-Comeau Drakkar
- Michel Bergeron Trophy - Offensive Rookie of the Year: Valentin Zykov, Baie-Comeau Drakkar
- Raymond Lagacé Trophy - Defensive Rookie of the Year: Philippe Desrosiers, Rimouski Océanic
- Frank J. Selke Memorial Trophy - Most sportsmanlike player: Zach O'Brien, Acadie–Bathurst Titan
- QMJHL Humanitarian of the Year - Humanitarian of the Year: Konrad Abeltshauser, Halifax Mooseheads
- Marcel Robert Trophy - Best Scholastic Player: Charles-David Beaudoin, Drummondville Voltigeurs
- Paul Dumont Trophy - Personality of the Year: Jonathan Drouin, Halifax Mooseheads

Executive

- Ron Lapointe Trophy - Coach of the Year: Dominique Ducharme, Halifax Mooseheads
- Maurice Filion Trophy - General Manager of the Year: Philippe Boucher, Rimouski Océanic
- John Horman Trophy - Executive of the Year: Serge Proulx, Baie-Comeau Drakkar
- Jean Sawyer Trophy - Marketing Director of the Year: Serge Proulx, Baie-Comeau Drakkar

All-Star Teams

First All-Star Team:

- Zachary Fucale, Goaltender, Halifax Mooseheads
- Kevin Gagné, Defenceman, Rimouski Océanic/Saint John Sea Dogs
- Xavier Ouellet, Defenceman, Blainville-Boisbriand Armada
- Josh Currie, Centre, P.E.I. Rocket
- Jonathan Drouin, Left Wing, Halifax Mooseheads
- Dmitri Jaskin, Right Wing, Moncton Wildcats

Second All-Star Team:

- Étienne Marcoux, Goaltender, Blainville-Boisbriand Armada
- Mathieu Brisebois, Defenceman, Rouyn-Noranda Huskies
- Konrad Abeltshauser, Defenceman, Halifax Mooseheads
- Nathan MacKinnon, Centre, Halifax Mooseheads
- Peter Trainor, Left Wing, Rimouski Océanic
- Anthony Mantha, Right Wing, Val-d'Or Foreurs

All-Rookie Team:

- Philippe Desrosiers, Goaltender, Rimouski Océanic
- Jan Kostalek, Defenceman, Rimouski Océanic
- Mackenzie Weegar, Defenceman, Halifax Mooseheads
- Frédérik Gauthier, Centre, Rimouski Océanic
- Ivan Barbashev, Left Wing, Moncton Wildcats
- Valentin Zykov, Right Wing, Baie-Comeau Drakkar

== See also ==
- 2013 Memorial Cup
- List of QMJHL seasons
- 2012–13 OHL season
- 2012–13 WHL season
- 2012 in ice hockey
- 2013 in ice hockey

Preceded by 2011–12 QMJHL season	QMJHL seasons	Succeeded by 2013–14 QMJHL season
