= Kevin Gagné =

Canadian ice hockey player

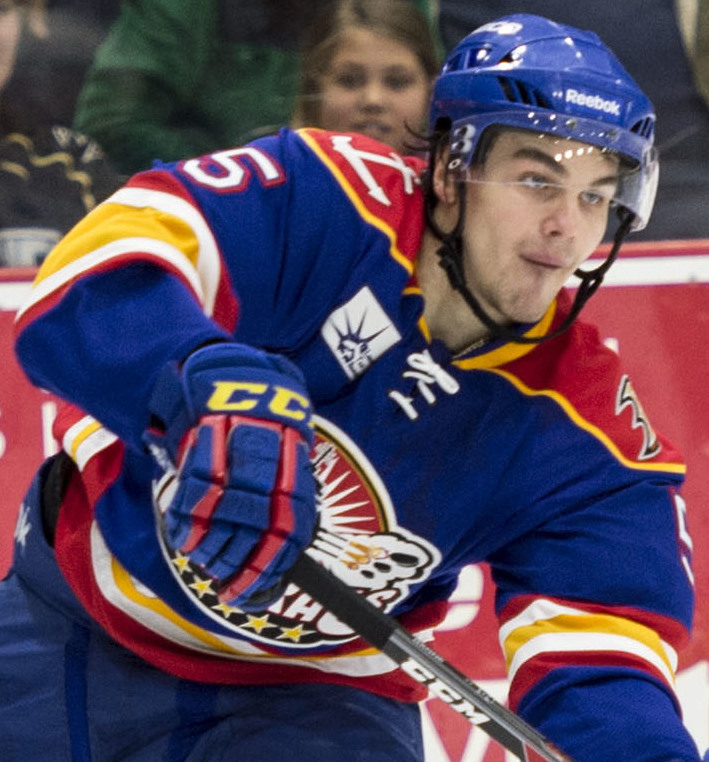
- Gagné with the Norfolk Admirals in 2013
- Born: April 14, 1992 (age 34) Edmundston, New Brunswick, Canada
- Height: 5 ft 8 in (173 cm)
- Weight: 176 lb (80 kg; 12 st 8 lb)
- Position: Defence
- Shoots: Left
- team Former teams: Free Agent; Norfolk Admirals; Mora IK; Rögle BK; Kölner Haie
- NHL draft: Undrafted
- Playing career: 2013–present

Kevin Gagné (born April 14, 1992) is a Canadian professional ice hockey defenceman. He is currently an unrestricted free agent, who most recently played with the Kölner Haie of the Deutsche Eishockey Liga (DEL).

== Playing career ==
Gagné was rated as a top prospect who played the majority of the 2012–13 season in the Quebec Major Junior Hockey League (QMJHL). Gagné was rewarded for his outstanding play during the 2012–13 QMJHL season by winning the Emile Bouchard Trophy as the league's top defenceman, and also being named to the QMJHL's First All-Star Team.

After two seasons with the Ducks American Hockey League affiliate, the Norfolk Admirals, Gagne was loaned for the last season of his entry-level contract to Sweden, agreeing to terms with Mora IK of the second division on November 2, 2015.

Following Mora IK's relegation from the SHL in the 2018–19 season, Gagné left to sign a one-year contract with German outfit, Kölner Haie of the Deutsche Eishockey Liga (DEL), on May 24, 2019.

== Awards and honours ==
Award	Year
QMJHL
First All-Star Team	2012–13
