= Jean-Sébastien Dea =

Canadian ice hockey player (born 1994)

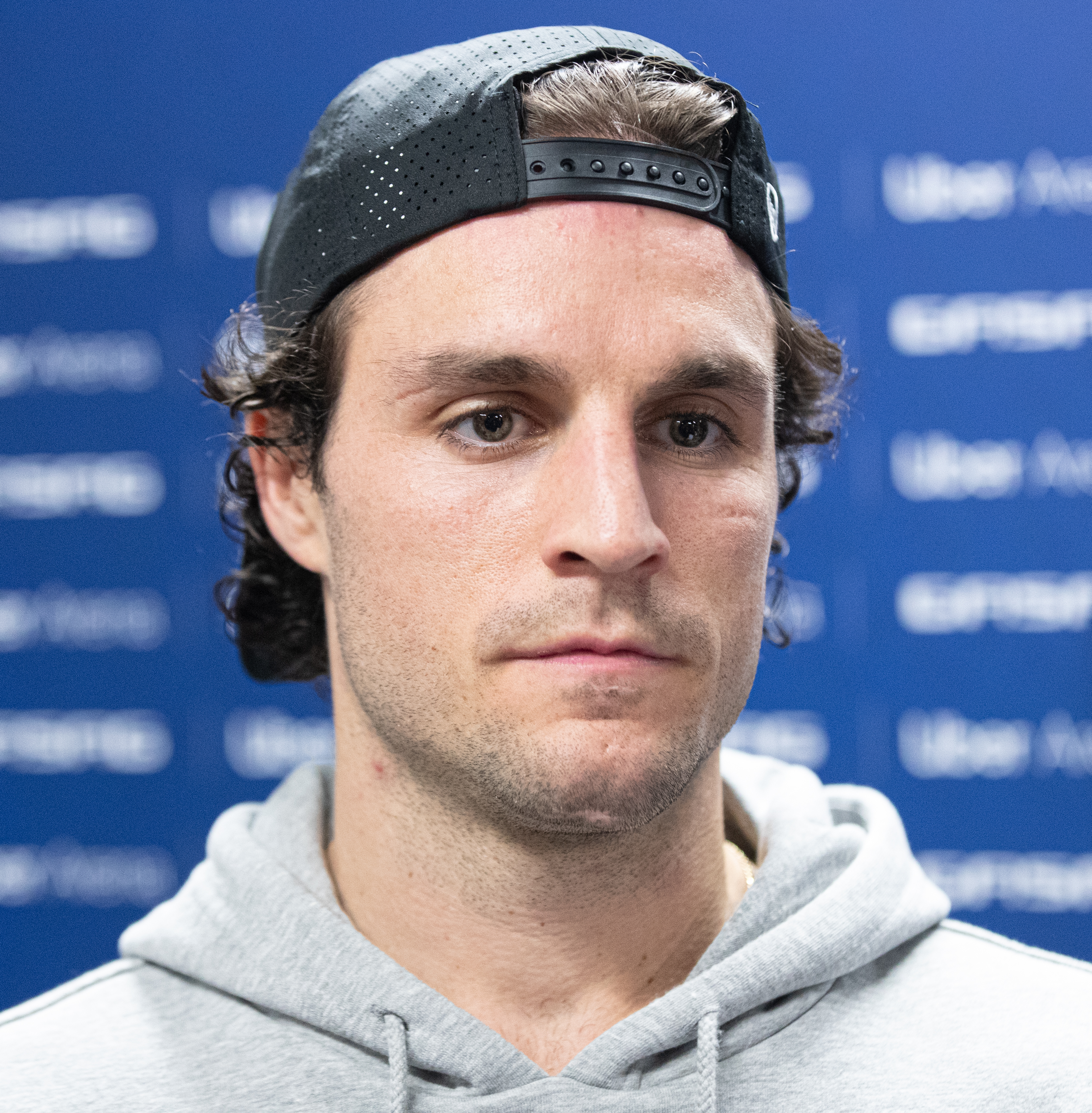
- Dea with the Eisbären Berlin in 2025
- Born: February 8, 1994 (age 32) La Prairie, Quebec, Canada
- Height: 5 ft 11 in (180 cm)
- Weight: 168 lb (76 kg; 12 st 0 lb)
- Position: Centre
- Shot: Right
- Played for: Pittsburgh Penguins; New Jersey Devils; Buffalo Sabres; Arizona Coyotes; Metallurg Magnitogorsk; Neftekhimik Nizhnekamsk; Eisbären Berlin
- NHL draft: Undrafted
- Playing career: 2014–2026

Jean-Sébastien Dea (born February 8, 1994) is a Canadian former professional ice hockey centre. He previously played for the Pittsburgh Penguins, New Jersey Devils, Buffalo Sabres, and Arizona Coyotes of the National Hockey League (NHL).

== Playing career ==
As a youth, Dea played in the 2007 Quebec International Pee-Wee Hockey Tournament with a minor ice hockey team from Saint-Laurent, Quebec. Dea played major junior hockey with the Rouyn-Noranda Huskies in the Quebec Major Junior Hockey League (QMJHL). In his final two years in the QMJHL, Dea scored 45 and 49 goals respectively.

Dea went undrafted by teams in the National Hockey League (NHL). As a free agent he agreed to a three-year entry-level contract with the Pittsburgh Penguins of the NHL on September 17, 2013. Dea made his pro debut for Pittsburgh's American Hockey League (AHL) affiliate, the Wilkes-Barre/Scranton Penguins, on April 19, 2014. Dea spent the 2014–15 season between the Wilkes-Barre/Scranton and the Wheeling Nailers of the ECHL. He scored ten goals and 21 points for Wilkes-Barre/Scranton, including his first professional goal on October 12 versus the Manchester Monarchs. He scored three goals and seven points in his 14 games in the ECHL. He spent the entire 2015–16 season with Wilkes-Barre/Scranton, registering 20 goals and 36 points in 75 games. He had a four-point night against the St. John's IceCaps on November 4. For the 2016 Stanley Cup playoffs, Dea was one of Pittsburgh's "Black Aces" on their playoff taxi squad.

Nearing the conclusion of the 2016–17 regular season, Dea received his first recall from Wilkes-Barre/Scranton to Pittsburgh on April 9, 2017. He made his NHL debut that night in the Penguins final regular season game, recording two penalty minutes in a 3–2 defeat to the New York Rangers. Dea was once again one of Pittsburgh's "Black Aces" during the 2017 Stanley Cup playoffs. He finished the season with 18 goals and 34 points in 73 games with Wilkes-Barre/Scranton. On August 21, 2017, the Penguins re-signed Dea to a one-year, two-way contract worth $650,000. On January 17, 2018, Dea was called up to the Penguins and made his season debut against the Anaheim Ducks. He scored his first NHL goal on January 23, 2018, against the Carolina Hurricanes. He was sent back to the AHL on January 26, 2018, after playing in four games. He finished the season with Wilkes-Barre/Scranton, scoring 18 goals and 50 points in 70 games. He was named the Wilkes-Barre/Scranton's team most valuable player.

Eventually, just before free agency on June 28, 2018, Dea re-signed with the Penguins for a year. During 2018 training camp, on September 28, Dea was claimed off waivers by the New Jersey Devils. After appearing in 20 games with the Devils, contributing with 3 goals and 5 points, Dea was again returned to waivers by the Devils. On November 29, Dea was re-claimed by the Penguins off waivers and was immediately re-assigned to the AHL with Wilkes-Barre/Scranton. He was later recalled after an injury to Dominik Simon and registered 1 goal in 3 games with Pittsburgh before he was again returned to Scranton.

Dea contributed with 6 goals and 22 points in 26 games for the Penguins in the AHL, before his second stint with Pittsburgh was cut short as he was dealt at the trade deadline to the Florida Panthers in exchange for Chris Wideman on February 25, 2019. In joining the Panthers' AHL affiliate, the Springfield Thunderbirds, for the remainder of campaign, Dea scored 22 points in just 20 games.

As an unrestricted free agent from the Panthers, Dea opted to sign a two-year, two-way contract with the Buffalo Sabres on July 1, 2019. He began the 2019–20 season with the Sabres' AHL affiliate, the Rochester Americans. He was recalled and made his Buffalo debut on November 27 versus the Calgary Flames. He was returned to Rochester until being recalled again on January 31, 2019 to replace an injured Kyle Okposo. In his second season with the Sabres, the pandemic-shortened 2020–21 season he played one game with Buffalo and 15 games with Rochester. In the AHL, he scored six goals and 15 points.

Following the conclusion of his contract with the Sabres, Dea returned to Canada, agreeing a one-year, two-way contract with the Montreal Canadiens on July 28, 2021. He was assigned to Montreal's AHL affiliate, the Laval Rocket, to begin the 2021–22 season after being part of Montreal's taxi squad. Playing on a line with Rafaël Harvey-Pinard, Dea took on a leadership role with the Rocket, on occasion being named one of the team's alternate captains. He led the Rocket with 26 goals and was second on the team with 52 points in 70 games.

On July 14, 2022, Dea was signed as a free agent to a two-year, two-way contract with the Arizona Coyotes. He appeared in four games with Arizona in his first year with the team, spending the majority of the time in the AHL with Arizona's affiliate, the Tucson Roadrunners, where he scored 23 goals and 50 points in 67 games. On August 6, 2023, the Coyotes and Dea mutually agreed to terminate his contract in order to pursue opportunities overseas. Shortly afterwards, on August 9, Dea signed a one-year contract with Metallurg Magnitogorsk of the Kontinental Hockey League (KHL). Dea made 18 appearances with Metallurg, registering just 6 points before he was traded to fellow KHL outfit, HC Neftekhimik Nizhnekamsk, on December 15, 2023.

In October 2025, Dea left Neftekhimik and joined Eisbären Berlin of the Deutsche Eishockey Liga (DEL).

== Career statistics ==
			Regular season					Playoffs
Season	Team	League	GP	G	A	Pts	PIM	GP	G	A	Pts	PIM
2010–11	Collège Charles-L. Riverains	QMAAA	42	26	29	55	28	5	6	3	9	6
2011–12	Rouyn-Noranda Huskies	QMJHL	50	17	15	32	42	4	1	2	3	0
2012–13	Rouyn-Noranda Huskies	QMJHL	68	45	40	85	59	14	12	9	21	24
2013–14	Rouyn-Noranda Huskies	QMJHL	65	49	26	75	53	9	6	3	9	12
2013–14	Wilkes-Barre/Scranton Penguins	AHL	1	0	0	0	0	—	—	—	—	—
2014–15	Wilkes-Barre/Scranton Penguins	AHL	43	10	11	21	16	4	0	0	0	2
2014–15	Wheeling Nailers	ECHL	14	4	3	7	6	—	—	—	—	—
2015–16	Wilkes-Barre/Scranton Penguins	AHL	75	20	16	36	36	10	0	0	0	18
2016–17	Wilkes-Barre/Scranton Penguins	AHL	73	18	16	34	59	5	2	1	3	4
2016–17	Pittsburgh Penguins	NHL	1	0	0	0	2	—	—	—	—	—
2017–18	Wilkes-Barre/Scranton Penguins	AHL	70	18	32	50	69	3	0	1	1	0
2017–18	Pittsburgh Penguins	NHL	5	1	0	1	2	—	—	—	—	—
2018–19	New Jersey Devils	NHL	20	3	2	5	6	—	—	—	—	—
2018–19	Wilkes-Barre/Scranton Penguins	AHL	26	6	16	22	40	—	—	—	—	—
2018–19	Pittsburgh Penguins	NHL	3	1	0	1	2	—	—	—	—	—
2018–19	Springfield Thunderbirds	AHL	20	11	11	22	18	—	—	—	—	—
2019–20	Rochester Americans	AHL	57	15	24	39	32	—	—	—	—	—
2019–20	Buffalo Sabres	NHL	3	0	0	0	0	—	—	—	—	—
2020–21	Rochester Americans	AHL	15	6	9	15	4	—	—	—	—	—
2020–21	Buffalo Sabres	NHL	1	0	0	0	2	—	—	—	—	—
2021–22	Laval Rocket	AHL	70	26	26	52	42	15	4	4	8	6
2022–23	Tucson Roadrunners	AHL	67	23	27	50	42	3	0	1	1	2
2022–23	Arizona Coyotes	NHL	4	0	0	0	0	—	—	—	—	—
2023–24	Metallurg Magnitogorsk	KHL	18	3	3	6	6	—	—	—	—	—
2023–24	Neftekhimik Nizhnekamsk	KHL	27	7	4	11	8	—	—	—	—	—
2024–25	Neftekhimik Nizhnekamsk	KHL	59	16	15	31	30	—	—	—	—	—
2025–26	Neftekhimik Nizhnekamsk	KHL	16	1	2	3	6	—	—	—	—	—
2025–26	Eisbären Berlin	DEL	26	2	4	6	8	15	1	4	5	2
NHL totals			37	5	2	7	14	—	—	—	—	—
KHL totals			120	27	24	51	50	—	—	—	—	—
