= Logan Shaw =

Canadian ice hockey player (born 1992)

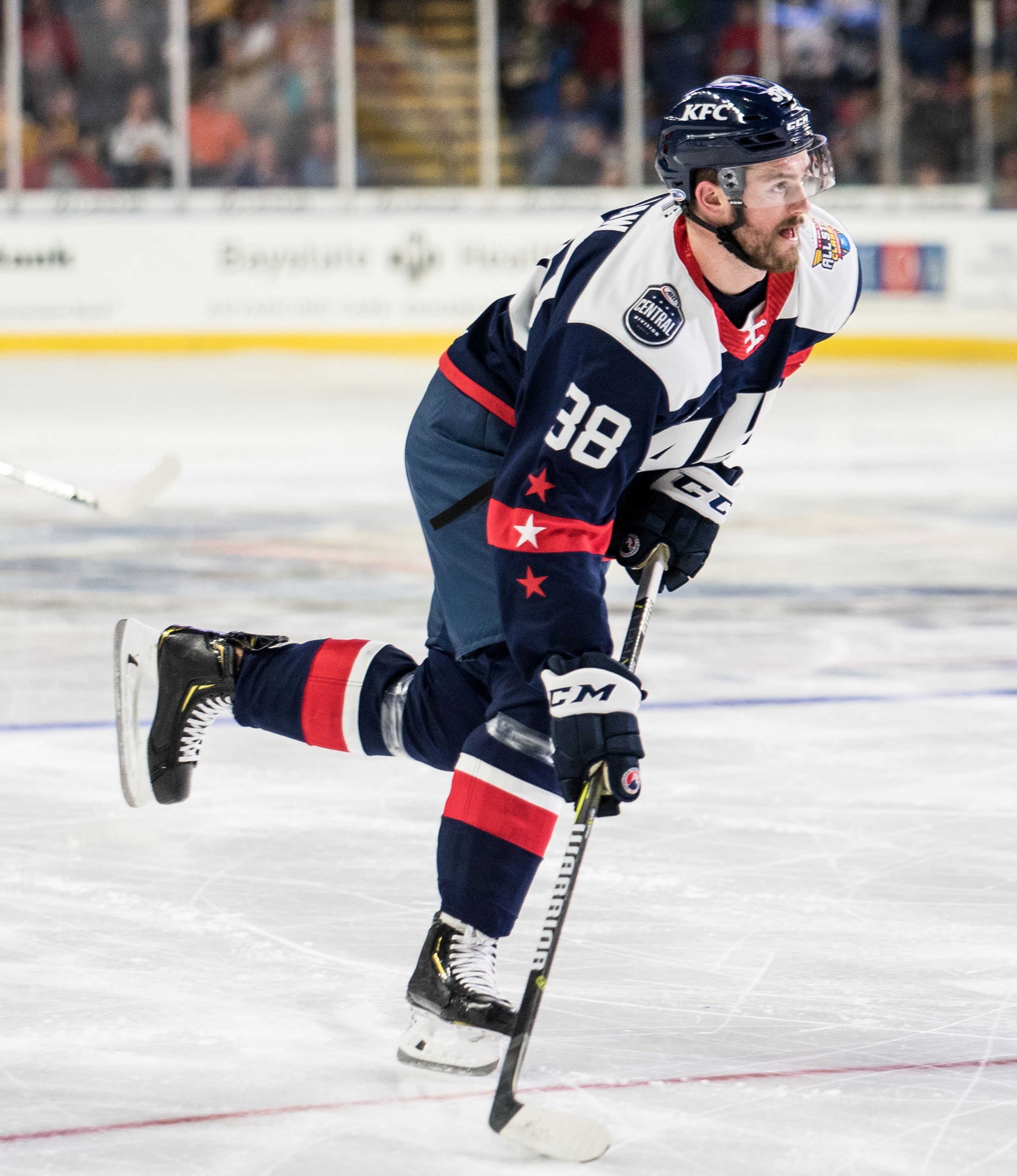
- Shaw at the 2019 AHL All-Star Game
- Born: October 5, 1992 (age 34) Glace Bay, Nova Scotia, Canada
- Height: 6 ft 3 in (191 cm)
- Weight: 208 lb (94 kg; 14 st 12 lb)
- Position: Right wing
- Shoots: Right
- AHL team Former teams: Toronto Marlies; Florida Panthers; Anaheim Ducks; Montreal Canadiens; Winnipeg Jets; Ottawa Senators
- NHL draft: 76th overall, 2011; Florida Panthers
- Playing career: 2013–present

Logan Shaw (born October 5, 1992) is a Canadian professional ice hockey player who is a right winger and captain for the Toronto Marlies in the American Hockey League (AHL). He was drafted 76th overall by the Florida Panthers in the 2011 NHL entry draft. He also previously played for the Anaheim Ducks, Montreal Canadiens, Winnipeg Jets, and Ottawa Senators. He won the Calder Cup in 2026 with the Marlies.

== Playing career ==
=== Amateur ===
Shaw played midget hockey within his native Nova Scotia with the Cape Breton Tradesmen before joining the major junior ranks with the Cape Breton Screaming Eagles of the Quebec Major Junior Hockey League (QMJHL), after he was selected 12th overall in the 2008 QMJHL entry draft. He made his QMJHL debut in the 2008–09 season, scoring five goals and three assists for eight points in 49 games played. The Screaming Eagles made the playoffs that season but lost to the Quebec Remparts in the quarterfinals. Shaw appeared in eight of the team's playoff games, going scoreless. He returned for the 2009–10 season and got into 67 games, scoring nine goals and 24 points. The Screaming Eagles qualified for the playoffs, but did not make it out of the first round, falling to the Moncton Wildcats. He finished the series going scoreless in five games. Shaw remained with the Screaming Eagles for a third season in 2010–11, appearing in 68 games, scoring 26 goals and 46 points. The Screaming Eagles once again made the playoffs and were eliminated in the first round, this time by the Saint John Sea Dogs. In four games, Shaw added one assist.

He appeared in 37 games with Cape Breton, scoring 14 goals and 26 points before he was traded during the 2011–12 season to the Quebec Remparts on January 7, 2012. In 23 games with the Remparts that season, he added six goals and 15 points as Quebec made the playoffs. Quebec advanced to the quarterfinals where they were eliminated by the Halifax Mooseheads. Shaw scored six goals and 11 points in 11 playoff games. In his final season in the QMJHL in 2012–13, he finished second in team scoring with the Remparts, with 26 goals and 68 points in 67 games and added three goals and eight points in eleven games in the playoffs. The Remparts were eliminated in the quarterfinals for the second consecutive year, this time by the Rouyn-Noranda Huskies. He finished his QMJHL career with 187 points in 311 games with Cape Breton and Quebec.

=== Professional ===
Shaw was selected by the Florida Panthers of the National Hockey League (NHL) in the third round, 76th overall in the 2011 NHL entry draft. On April 22, 2013, Shaw was signed by the Panthers to a three-year entry-level contract. Shaw was assigned to begin his professional career with the Panthers' American Hockey League (AHL) affiliate, the San Antonio Rampage, in the 2013–14 season. During his time with San Antonio, Shaw was demoted to the ECHL's Cincinnati Cyclones, being recalled on December 30 after recording eight goals and 18 points in 20 games. In 46 games with San Antonio, Shaw tallied one goal and eight points. He was sent back to Cincinnati for their 2014 Kelly Cup playoff run. The Cyclones advanced to the Kelly Cup finals where they were beat by the Alaska Aces. In 24 playoff games, Shaw scored five goals and six points. In his first full season in the AHL in 2014–15, he tallied 13 goals and 25 points in 69 games. The Rampage made the 2015 Calder Cup playoffs where they faced the Oklahoma City Barons in the first round. The Rampage's playoff run was short, as they were swept by the Barons in their best-of-five series.

In the 2015–16 season, after five games with new AHL affiliate, the Portland Pirates, Shaw received his first NHL recall to the Panthers on October 29, 2015. He made his NHL debut with the Panthers in a 3–1 defeat to the Boston Bruins on October 30. He was sent back to Portland, only to be recalled again in November. He scored his first NHL goal against Craig Anderson on December 8 in a 4–2 loss to the Ottawa Senators. Shaw completed his first NHL season with the Panthers, contributing with five goals and seven points in 53 games. He was reassigned to Portland on April 1, 2016. In 19 games with the Pirates, he registered 11 goals and 14 points. The Pirates made the 2016 Calder Cup playoffs and Shaw made three appearances, going scoreless. His stay in Portland was short-lived as he was recalled by Florida for the 2016 Stanley Cup playoffs and featured in three post-season games in the Panthers' first-round defeat.

Shaw re-signed with the Panthers to one-year, two-way deal on July 20. In the 2016–17 season, Shaw was unable to retain his role with the Panthers and was placed on waivers. After going unclaimed, he reassigned to their new AHL affiliate, the Springfield Thunderbirds. He scored four goals in 13 games with the Thunderbirds before he was traded by the Panthers to the Anaheim Ducks in exchange for forward Michael Sgarbossa on November 16. He was immediately assigned to their AHL affiliate, the San Diego Gulls, where he had a brief stint, appearing twice and going scoreless, before he was recalled on November 25. He made his Anaheim debut that night in a 3–2 loss to the Chicago Blackhawks. He marked his first goal and point with the franchise on December 4 in an 8–3 loss to the Calgary Flames. In 55 games with Anaheim, he scored three goals and ten points. On March 3, 2017, the Ducks signed Shaw to a one-year contract extension. The Ducks won the Pacific Division and advanced to the Western Conference finals of the 2017 Stanley Cup playoffs where they were eliminated by the Nashville Predators. Shaw got into nine playoff games in the first two rounds, before suffering a groin injury, keeping him out of the Western Conference finals. He went scoreless.

During the 2017–18 season, after the Ducks picked up J. T. Brown off waivers from the Tampa Bay Lightning, Shaw was placed on waivers to make room on the roster. He appeared in 42 games scoring two goals and eight points for the Ducks. He was then claimed by the Montreal Canadiens on January 15, 2018. Shaw was inserted into the Canadiens lineup and made his debut on March 19 in a 3–2 victory over the Washington Capitals. He tallied his first goal and point for the team in a 5–2 win over the Ducks. He played out the remainder of the season with Montreal, appearing in 30 games recording two goals and six points.

As an impending restricted free agent, Shaw was not tendered a qualifying offer from the Canadiens and was released to free agency on June 25, 2018. Un-signed over the summer, Shaw accepted an invitation and attended the Calgary Flames 2018 training camp. He was unable to make the Flames roster and was assigned to their AHL affiliate, the Stockton Heat. However, instead of staying with the Flames organization, Shaw returned to the Ducks organization, signing a professional try-out contract with the San Diego Gulls on October 3, 2018. He secured a standard playing contract to remain with the Gulls for the season a week later on October 10, 2018. He made seven appearances for the Gulls, scoring twice and adding five points.

On November 11, 2018, Shaw left the Gulls to sign a one-year, two-way contract with the Winnipeg Jets. He did not appear in a game with the Jets, but rather spent the remainder of the season with the Manitoba Moose. In 63 games, Shaw led the Moose with 27 goals and finished second in scoring with 46 points. He was selected to represent the Moose at the 2019 AHL All-Star Classic on January 18, 2019. On May 31, the Jets re-signed Shaw to a one-year, two-way contract extension worth $700,000. He began the 2019–20 season with the Moose, but was recalled on October 28. He made his Jets debut on October 29 in a 7–4 loss to the Ducks. He scored his first goal and point with the team on December 15 in a 7–4 victory over the Philadelphia Flyers. He split the season between the two teams, appearing in 35 games for the Jets scoring two goals and five points and four goals and seven points in 16 games with the Moose. The season was cut short, ending on March 12, 2020, due to the COVID-19 pandemic. When play resumed for the 2020 Stanley Cup playoffs in August, the Jets faced the Flames in the best-of-five qualifying round. The Flames beat the Jets three games to one to take the series, with Shaw appearing in three of the four games, going scoreless.

On October 9, 2020, Shaw signed a two-year, two-way contract with the Ottawa Senators. In the pandemic-shortened 2020–21 season, which he spent entirely with Ottawa's AHL affiliate, the Belleville Senators, he recorded six goals and 15 points in 24 games. He was named Belleville's captain on March 1, 2021. However, in his second season, after a series of injuries to Ottawa's centres, Shaw began the campaign Ottawa. He made his debut in the season opener on October 14, a 3–2 win over the Toronto Maple Leafs. He recorded his first goal and point for the team on November 6 in a 5–3 loss to the Lightning. He played in 16 games with Ottawa, scoring one goal and three points before being assigned to Belleville on November 29. He was recalled one last time on December 31, appearing in one more game before finishing the season in Belleville where he recorded 15 goals and 35 points in 53 appearances. Belleville made the Calder Cup playoffs for the first time in franchise history and faced the Rochester Americans. However, the team was swept in the first round best-of-three series. In the two games, Shaw registered two assists.

Following his two seasons under contract with the Senators, Shaw left as an unrestricted free agent and was signed to a three-year AHL contract by the Toronto Marlies, primary affiliate to the Toronto Maple Leafs, on July 13, 2022. He was named the team captain on December 7. In his first season with the Marlies in 2022–23 he tallied 21 goals and 69 points, and was selected to represent the team at the 2023 AHL All-Star Classic. The Marlies made the 2023 Calder Cup playoffs and advanced to the third round were they were knocked out by the Rochester Americans. In seven playoff games, Shaw scored four goals and ten points. Shaw attended the Maple Leafs 2023 training camp, but was assigned to the Marlies to start the 2023–24 season. In 68 games he set a career-high in goals, potting 30, and marking 58 points as the Marlies returned to the playoffs. However, the Marlies were eliminated by Shaw's former AHL team, the Belleville Senators, in the first round. In three playoff games, he registered one goal and two points. In the final season of his contract with the Marlies in 2024–25, Shaw's scoring declined, only recording 12 goals and 42 points in 68 games. Shaw signed a two-year contract extension with the Marlies on December 20, 2024. For the third time in his career, Shaw was named to the AHL All-Star Classic, representing the Marlies in 2025. The Marlies still made the 2025 Calder Cup playoffs and faced the Cleveland Monsters in the opening round. However, the Monsters proved too much for the Marlies, sweeping them in their best-of-three series.

Once again with the Marlies for the 2025–26 campaign, Shaw's scoring rebounded, tallying 23 goals and 54 points in 72 appearances. During the season he led the team in assists and points and became the franchise leader in assists and points. The Marlies made the 2026 Calder Cup playoffs and advanced to the final where they beat the Chicago Wolves to win the Calder Cup. In 24 playoff games, he scored nine times and registered 17 points. He signed a one-year contract extension, set to begin in the 2027–28 season, on October 2, 2026.

== Career statistics ==
=== Regular season and playoffs ===
| | | | Regular season | | | | | Playoffs |
| Season | Team | League | GP | G | A | Pts | PIM | GP | G | A | Pts | PIM |
|---|---|---|---|---|---|---|---|---|---|---|---|---|
| 2007–08 | Cape Breton Tradesmen | NSMMHL | 34 | 17 | 22 | 39 | 55 | 10 | 3 | 9 | 12 | 8 |
| 2008–09 | Cape Breton Screaming Eagles | QMJHL | 49 | 5 | 3 | 8 | 22 | 8 | 0 | 0 | 0 | 0 |
| 2009–10 | Cape Breton Screaming Eagles | QMJHL | 67 | 9 | 15 | 24 | 31 | 5 | 0 | 0 | 0 | 4 |
| 2010–11 | Cape Breton Screaming Eagles | QMJHL | 68 | 26 | 20 | 46 | 37 | 4 | 0 | 1 | 1 | 4 |
| 2011–12 | Cape Breton Screaming Eagles | QMJHL | 37 | 14 | 12 | 26 | 27 | — | — | — | — | — |
| 2011–12 | Quebec Remparts | QMJHL | 23 | 6 | 9 | 15 | 19 | 11 | 6 | 5 | 11 | 12 |
| 2012–13 | Quebec Remparts | QMJHL | 67 | 26 | 42 | 68 | 37 | 11 | 3 | 5 | 8 | 8 |
| 2013–14 | San Antonio Rampage | AHL | 46 | 1 | 7 | 8 | 24 | — | — | — | — | — |
| 2013–14 | Cincinnati Cyclones | ECHL | 20 | 8 | 10 | 18 | 8 | 24 | 5 | 1 | 6 | 4 |
| 2014–15 | San Antonio Rampage | AHL | 69 | 13 | 12 | 25 | 25 | 2 | 0 | 0 | 0 | 0 |
| 2015–16 | Portland Pirates | AHL | 19 | 11 | 3 | 14 | 4 | 3 | 0 | 0 | 0 | 0 |
| 2015–16 | Florida Panthers | NHL | 53 | 5 | 2 | 7 | 13 | 3 | 0 | 0 | 0 | 0 |
| 2016–17 | Springfield Thunderbirds | AHL | 13 | 4 | 2 | 6 | 2 | — | — | — | — | — |
| 2016–17 | San Diego Gulls | AHL | 2 | 0 | 0 | 0 | 0 | — | — | — | — | — |
| 2016–17 | Anaheim Ducks | NHL | 55 | 3 | 7 | 10 | 10 | 9 | 0 | 0 | 0 | 4 |
| 2017–18 | Anaheim Ducks | NHL | 42 | 2 | 6 | 8 | 4 | — | — | — | — | — |
| 2017–18 | Montreal Canadiens | NHL | 30 | 2 | 4 | 6 | 8 | — | — | — | — | — |
| 2018–19 | San Diego Gulls | AHL | 7 | 2 | 3 | 5 | 6 | — | — | — | — | — |
| 2018–19 | Manitoba Moose | AHL | 63 | 27 | 19 | 46 | 38 | — | — | — | — | — |
| 2019–20 | Manitoba Moose | AHL | 16 | 4 | 3 | 7 | 10 | — | — | — | — | — |
| 2019–20 | Winnipeg Jets | NHL | 35 | 3 | 2 | 5 | 0 | 3 | 0 | 0 | 0 | 0 |
| 2020–21 | Belleville Senators | AHL | 24 | 6 | 9 | 15 | 8 | — | — | — | — | — |
| 2021–22 | Ottawa Senators | NHL | 17 | 1 | 2 | 3 | 2 | — | — | — | — | — |
| 2021–22 | Belleville Senators | AHL | 53 | 15 | 20 | 35 | 20 | 2 | 0 | 2 | 2 | 0 |
| 2022–23 | Toronto Marlies | AHL | 69 | 21 | 48 | 69 | 36 | 7 | 4 | 6 | 10 | 2 |
| 2023–24 | Toronto Marlies | AHL | 68 | 30 | 28 | 58 | 28 | 3 | 1 | 1 | 2 | 4 |
| 2024–25 | Toronto Marlies | AHL | 68 | 12 | 30 | 42 | 30 | 2 | 0 | 1 | 1 | 0 |
| 2025–26 | Toronto Marlies | AHL | 72 | 23 | 31 | 54 | 45 | 24 | 9 | 8 | 17 | 28 |
| NHL totals | | | 232 | 16 | 23 | 39 | 37 | 15 | 0 | 0 | 0 | 4 |

=== International ===
| Year | Team | Event | Result | GP | G | A | Pts | PIM |
|---|---|---|---|---|---|---|---|---|
| 2009 | Canada Atlantic | U17 | 9th | 5 | 0 | 2 | 2 | 18 |
| Junior totals | | | | 5 | 0 | 2 | 2 | 18 |

== Awards and honours ==
| Award | Year |
AHL
| AHL All-Star Classic | 2019, 2023, 2025 |
| Calder Cup champion | 2026 |
