= Josh Currie =

Canadian ice hockey player (born 1992)

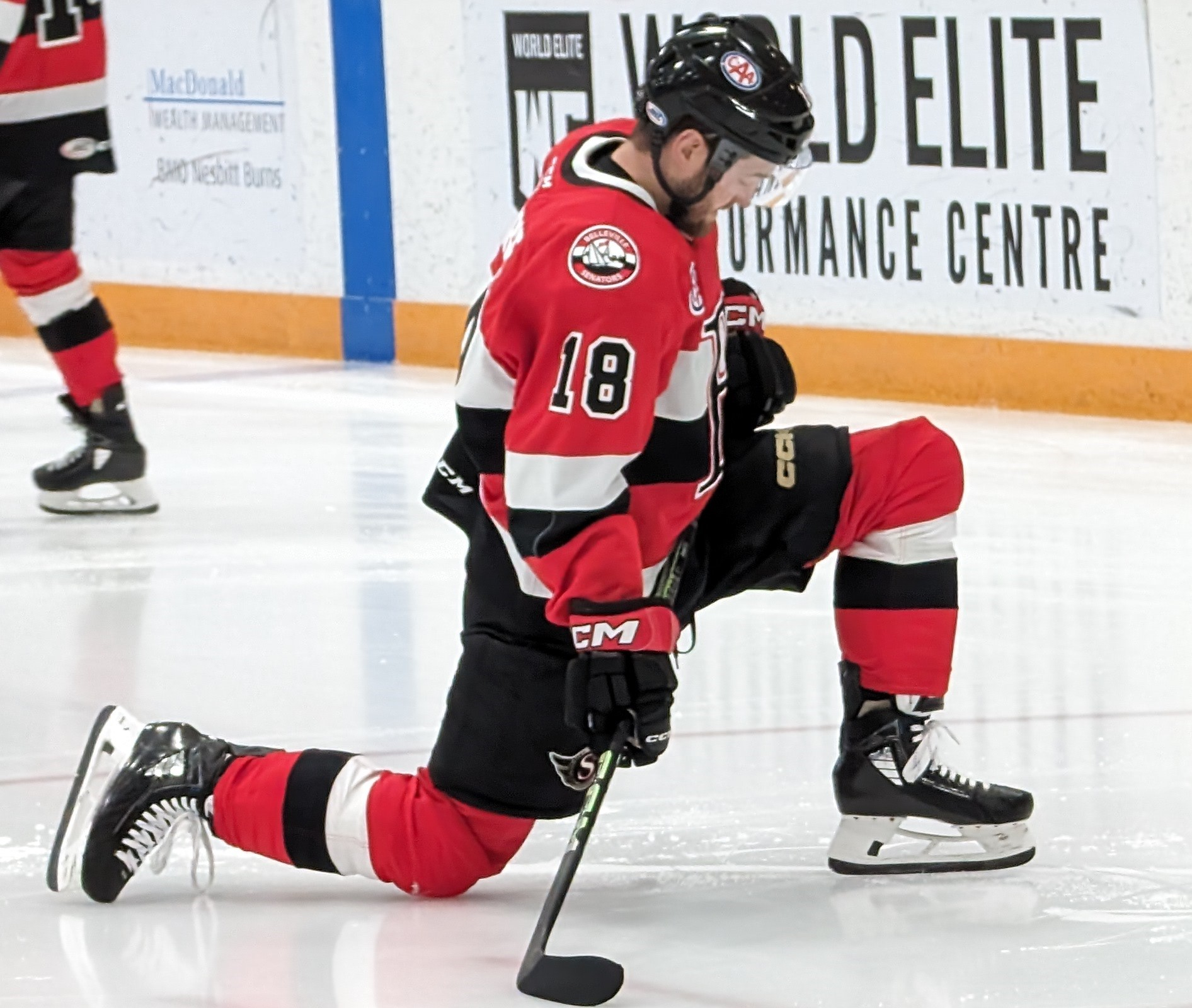
- Currie with the Belleville Senators in 2024
- Born: October 29, 1992 (age 33) Charlottetown, Prince Edward Island, Canada
- Height: 5 ft 10 in (178 cm)
- Weight: 172 lb (78 kg; 12 st 4 lb)
- Position: Right wing
- Shoots: Right
- ICE team Former teams: Graz 99ers Edmonton Oilers; Pittsburgh Penguins; Metallurg Magnitogorsk
- NHL draft: Undrafted
- Playing career: 2013–present

Josh Currie (born October 29, 1992) is a Canadian professional ice hockey forward for Graz 99ers of the Austrian ICE Hockey League. He has previously played for the Edmonton Oilers and Pittsburgh Penguins of the National Hockey League (NHL) and Metallurg Magnitogorsk of the Kontinental Hockey League (KHL).

== Playing career ==
=== Amateur ===
Currie played major junior hockey with the Prince Edward Island Rocket of the Quebec Major Junior Hockey League (QMJHL). He made his debut in the 2009–10 season, appearing in 49 games, scoring nine goals and six assists for 15 points. The Rocket qualified for the 2010 QMJHL playoffs and faced the Saint John Sea Dogs in the first round. They were eliminated in five games, four games to one, in their best-of-seven series. Currie played in all five games, going scoreless. In his second season with the Rocket in 2010–11, he appeared in 52 games, scoring nine goals and 20 points. Prince Edward Island made the playoffs again and faced the Shawinigan Cataractes in the first round. They were eliminated four games to one and Currie appeared in all five games, going scoreless.

After going undrafted in the National Hockey League (NHL)'s entry draft, Currie returned to the Rocket for the 2011–12 season. Currie was named the Rocket's captain in January 2012 after their existing captain, Matt Hobbs, was traded away. He finished the season with 30 goals and 46 points in 68 games. In the 2012–13 season, Currie played in 68 games, scoring 49 goals and 104 points. He was rewarded for his outstanding play by being named to the QMJHL's First All-Star Team. The Rocket qualified for the playoffs and faced the Val-d'Or Foreurs in the first round. The Rocket lost the series 4 games to 2 with Currie adding one goal and four points in the six games.

=== Professional ===
As an undrafted free agent, Currie signed with the Phoenix Coyotes of the NHL, but was sent to their ECHL affiliate, the Gwinnett Gladiators, for the 2013–14 season. He appeared in 70 games, recording 15 goals and 31 points. He signed with the Bakersfield Condors, the ECHL affiliate of the Edmonton Oilers, on August 27, 2014. In his first season in Bakersfield, Currie scored 14 goals and 42 points in 71 games in 2014–15. In 2015, the Edmonton Oilers moved their American Hockey League (AHL) affiliate franchise to become the Bakersfield Condors and the ECHL Condors team was displaced. On August 19, 2015, Currie continued in the ECHL with the Condors' replacement franchise, agreeing to a one-year deal with the now relocated Norfolk Admirals. In 13 games with Norfolk during the, he scored six goals and 12 points before he was loaned to Bakersfield in November 2015. He appeared in 53 games for Bakersfield, tallying ten goals and 24 points.

In September 2016 he was offered a professional tryout contract (PTO) with the Oilers and attended their training camp. He did not make the Oilers and was assigned to Bakersfield for the 2016–17 season. He played in 67 games, scoring 22 goals and 36 points. He signed a two-year AHL contract to return to Bakersfield on July 6, 2017. Currie returned to Bakersfield for the 2017–18 season, scoring 20 goals and 46 points in 68 games. On July 19, 2018, after impressing in each of his three seasons with the Condors, Currie was signed to his first NHL contract in agreeing to a two-year, two-way contract with the Edmonton Oilers. He was assigned to Bakersfield to start the 2018–19 season, and appeared in 53 games, scoring 27 goals and 41 points. He earned his first NHL recall by the Oilers on February 18, 2019. He made his debut on February 19 against the Arizona Coyotes. He scored his first NHL goal on February 23 against Kevin Doyle of the Anaheim Ducks in a 2–1 victory. He appeared in 21 games for Edmonton, tallying two goals and five points. He was sent back to Bakersfield for the 2019 Calder Cup playoffs. In ten playoff games, he scored one goal and four points. In the second year of his deal he spent the entire 2019–20 season with Bakersfield, putting up 24 goals and 41 points in 56 games before the AHL suspended the season due to the COVID-19 pandemic on March 12, 2020.

On October 9, 2020, having left the Oilers organization, Currie signed a one-year, two-way contract with the Pittsburgh Penguins. He was assigned to Pittsburgh's AHL affiliate, the Wilkes-Barre/Scranton Penguins, for the pandemic-delayed 2020–21 season. He was named captain of the AHL Penguins on February 21, 2021. He was recalled by Pittsburgh from the taxi squad for the first time on February 25, but did not see any game time before returning to Wilkes-Barre/Scranton. He was recalled again on March 2 and made his debut for Pittsburgh that night against the Philadelphia Flyers, going scoreless. He was returned to the AHL on March 10. He appeared in just the one game for Pittsburgh, with another brief callup in which he did not play any games for Pittsburgh at the end of March. He played in 24 games with Wilkes-Barre/Scranton, scoring ten goals and 23 points.

At the conclusion of the season, Currie left the Penguins organization as an impending free agent and signed a one-year contract with Russian club, Metallurg Magnitogorsk of the Kontinental Hockey League (KHL), on June 11, 2021. In his first season with Metallurg in 2021–22, he recorded ten goals and 26 points in 48 games. In February 2022, he signed a one-year extension with the Russian team. Metallurg finished atop the Eastern Conference and qualified for the KHL playoffs, advancing to the Gagarin Cup final, where they were defeated by CSKA Moscow. Currie ended the playoffs with five goals and nine points in 23 games. In his second season with Metallurg in 2022–23, Currie appeared in 48 games, tallying three goals and 12 points. Metallurg fell to fifth in the conference, but still qualified for the playoffs. They faced Avtomobilist Yekaterinburg in the opening round but advanced to the second round against Avangard Omsk, in which they were eliminated. Currie appeared in only five of team's eleven playoff games, going scoreless.

On July 1, 2023, Currie returned to North America to sign a one-year, two-way contract with the Ottawa Senators. Currie attended Ottawa's training camp, but failed to make the team. He was placed on waivers on September 29. After going unclaimed, he was assigned to Ottawa's AHL affiliate, the Belleville Senators, for the 2023–24 season. He appeared in 62 games with Belleville, scoring 12 goals and 29 points. Belleville qualified for the 2024 Calder Cup playoffs and faced the Toronto Marlies in the first round. They eliminated the Marlies to face the top-seeded Cleveland Monsters in the second round. The Monsters swept the Senators in four games in their best-of-five series. Currie added three goals and six points in seven games.

Having concluded his contract with the Senators, Currie returned abroad as a free agent and agreed to a one-year deal with German club, Kölner Haie of the DEL, on July 25, 2024. In his only season in the DEL, he recorded 12 goals and 23 points in 49 games. Kölner Haie made the playoffs and in 16 playoff games he tallied five goals and seven points. On July 15, 2025, he moved to Graz 99ers of the Austrian ICE Hockey League. In 44 games, he recorded 16 goals and 39 points. The team went undefeated in the playoffs and won the ICE championship. In twelve playoff games, he scored five goals and nine points.

== Personal life ==
Currie is married and has one child.

== Career statistics ==
=== Regular season and playoffs ===
			Regular season					Playoffs
Season	Team	League	GP	G	A	Pts	PIM	GP	G	A	Pts	PIM
2008–09	Summerside Western Capitals	MJAHL	45	8	17	25	7	—	—	—	—	—
2009–10	P.E.I. Rocket	QMJHL	49	9	6	15	16	5	0	0	0	0
2010–11	P.E.I. Rocket	QMJHL	52	9	11	20	9	5	0	0	0	0
2011–12	P.E.I. Rocket	QMJHL	68	30	16	46	33	—	—	—	—	—
2012–13	P.E.I. Rocket	QMJHL	68	49	55	104	62	6	1	3	4	6
2013–14	Gwinnett Gladiators	ECHL	70	15	16	31	41	—	—	—	—	—
2014–15	Bakersfield Condors	ECHL	71	14	28	42	49	—	—	—	—	—
2015–16	Norfolk Admirals	ECHL	13	6	6	12	8	—	—	—	—	—
2015–16	Bakersfield Condors	AHL	53	10	14	24	49	—	—	—	—	—
2016–17	Bakersfield Condors	AHL	67	22	14	36	28	—	—	—	—	—
2017–18	Bakersfield Condors	AHL	68	20	26	46	52	—	—	—	—	—
2018–19	Bakersfield Condors	AHL	53	27	14	41	17	10	1	3	4	6
2018–19	Edmonton Oilers	NHL	21	2	3	5	2	—	—	—	—	—
2019–20	Bakersfield Condors	AHL	56	24	17	41	60	—	—	—	—	—
2020–21	Pittsburgh Penguins	NHL	1	0	0	0	0	—	—	—	—	—
2020–21	Wilkes-Barre/Scranton Penguins	AHL	24	10	13	23	24	—	—	—	—	—
2021–22	Metallurg Magnitogorsk	KHL	48	10	16	26	44	23	5	4	9	65
2022–23	Metallurg Magnitogorsk	KHL	48	3	9	12	4	5	0	0	0	4
2023–24	Belleville Senators	AHL	62	12	17	29	39	7	3	3	6	4
2024–25	Kölner Haie	DEL	49	12	11	23	19	16	5	2	7	2
NHL totals			22	2	3	5	2	—	—	—	—	—
KHL totals			96	13	25	38	48	28	5	4	9	69

=== International ===
Year	Team	Event	Result	GP	G	A	Pts	PIM
2009	Canada Atlantic	U17	9th	5	0	2	2	2
Junior totals				5	0	2	2	2

== Awards and honours ==
Award	Year
QMJHL
First All-Star Team	2012–13
