= Valentin Zykov =

Russian ice hockey player (born 1995)

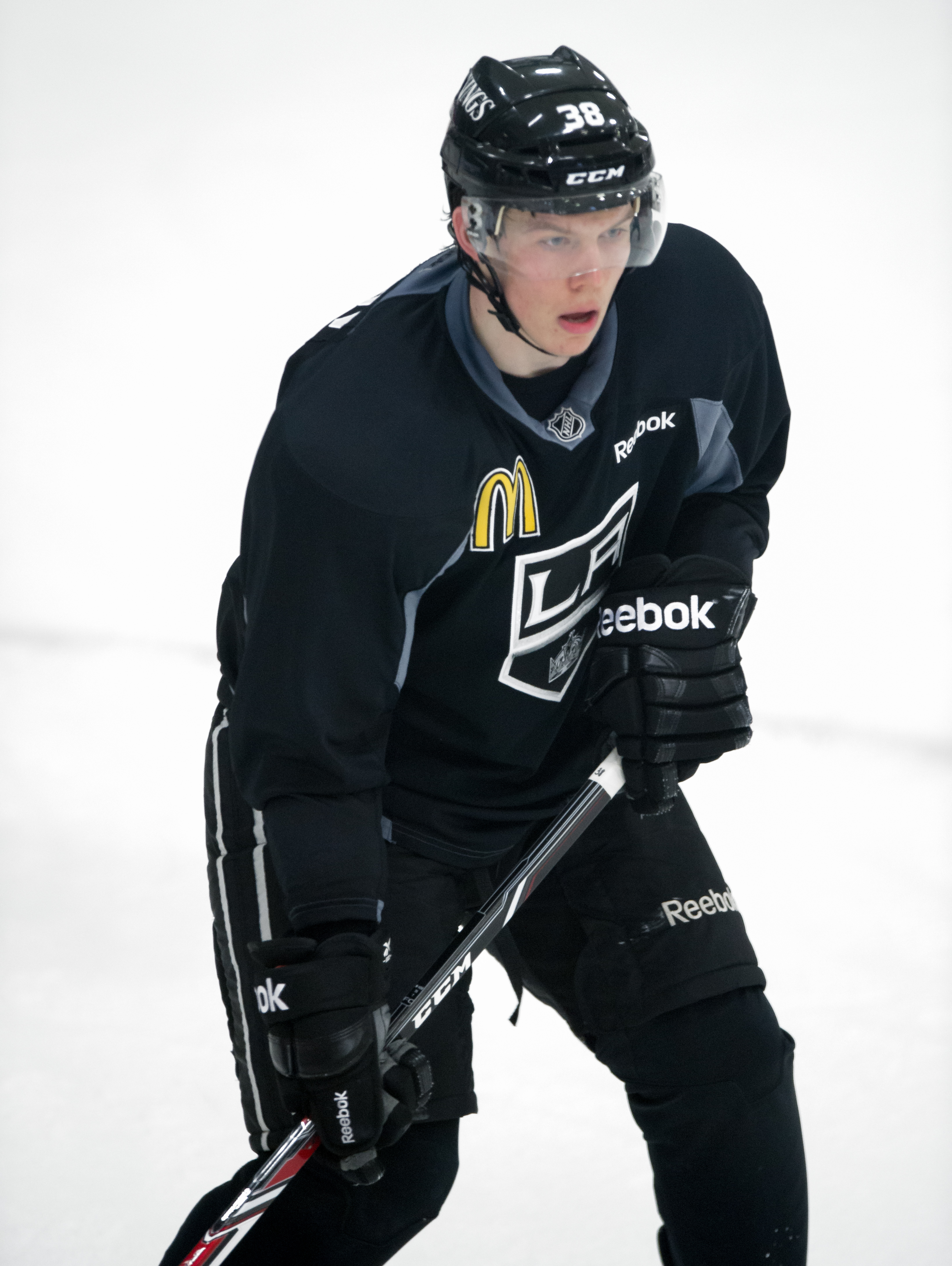
- Zykov with the Los Angeles Kings in 2013
- Born: 15 May 1995 (age 31) Saint Petersburg, Russia
- Height: 6 ft 1 in (185 cm)
- Weight: 224 lb (102 kg; 16 st 0 lb)
- Position: Winger
- Shoots: Right
- KHL team Former teams: SKA Saint Petersburg; Carolina Hurricanes; Edmonton Oilers; Vegas Golden Knights; Modo Hockey
- NHL draft: 37th overall, 2013; Los Angeles Kings
- Playing career: 2015–present

Valentin Valentinovich Zykov (Russian: Валентин Валентинович Зыков; born 15 May 1995) is a Russian professional ice hockey winger who is currently playing for SKA Saint Petersburg in the Kontinental Hockey League (KHL). He was selected by the Los Angeles Kings in the second round (37th overall) of the 2013 NHL entry draft.

Zykov was a top prospect who was ranked number eight on the NHL Central Scouting Bureau's final ranking of North American skaters. He was expected to be a first round selection in the 2013 NHL entry draft, but went in the second round, 37th overall, to the Los Angeles Kings.

== Playing career ==
As a 16-year-old, Zykov played in the MHL with CSKA-Krasnaja Armija Moskva, the junior affiliate for HC CSKA Moscow of the Kontinental Hockey League. Zykov was drafted in the second round (76th overall) of the 2012 CHL Import Draft by Baie-Comeau Drakkar, and joined the QMJHL team for the 2012–13 season. As a 17-year-old, Zykov was added to Team Russia's roster for the 2012 Subway Super Series, and in his first QMJHL season Zykov racked up 40 goals and 35 assists for 75 points in 67 games played to win the Michel Bergeron Trophy as the QMJHL's Offensive Rookie of the Year. He was further rewarded for his outstanding played by being named the QMJHL Rookie of the Year.

During the 2014–15 QMJHL season, Zykov was traded from Baie-Comeau to the Gatineau Olympiques in exchange for Václav Karabáček.

After attending the Kings training camp, Zykov was assigned to begin his rookie professional season in 2015–16 with the Ontario Reign of the AHL. Zykov compiled 7 goals and 14 points in 43 games with the Reign before he was traded by the Kings along with a conditional 5th round pick (if Los Angeles advanced to the 2016 Western Conference Final, failed) to the Carolina Hurricanes in exchange for Kris Versteeg on 28 February 2016.

Zykov played his first NHL game and recorded his first NHL goal on 9 March 2017, in a game against the New York Rangers.

Zykov was selected for the 2018 AHL All-Star Game after leading the league in goals scored and beating his own career high in goals. After recording his 30th goal of the season in a game against the Hartford Wolf Pack, Zykov became the first Russian-born skater to score 30 goals or more in an AHL season since Artem Anisimov did so during the 2008–09 season. He was recalled to the NHL for the second time during the 2017–18 season on 19 March 2018. Zykov was voted by fans as the Checkers' best forward of the 2017–18 season following the team's elimination from the 2018 Calder Cup playoffs. At season's end, Zykov led the league in goals with 33, and finished second in team scoring with 54 points.

In the following 2018–19 season, Zykov made the Hurricanes opening season roster. As the club's reserve forward, Zykov was a frequent healthy scratch, and was reassigned on a conditioning loan back to the Checkers on 13 November 2018. He later returned to the Hurricanes and after 13 games having collected 3 assists, Zykov was placed on waivers by the Hurricanes and was claimed by the Edmonton Oilers on 30 November 2018. Zykov appeared in just 5 games with the Oilers over the following month before he was returned to waivers and claimed by the Vegas Golden Knights on 29 December 2018.

As a free agent from the Golden Knights, leading into the pandemic delayed 2020–21 season, Zykov remained un-signed. He later left North America and joined Swedish second tier club, Modo Hockey of the HockeyAllsvenskan on 12 February 2021. In his short tenure with Modo, he collected 2 goals and 4 points in 7 games.

As a free agent leading into the 2021–22 season, Zykov returned to his native Russia and agreed to a contract with contending KHL outfit, SKA Saint Petersburg, on 12 October 2021.

== Career statistics ==
=== Regular season and playoffs ===
			Regular season					Playoffs
Season	Team	League	GP	G	A	Pts	PIM	GP	G	A	Pts	PIM
2011–12	Krasnaya Armiya Moskva	MHL	52	5	6	11	105	18	0	2	2	4
2012–13	Baie–Comeau Drakkar	QMJHL	67	40	35	75	60	19	10	9	19	18
2013–14	Baie–Comeau Drakkar	QMJHL	53	23	40	63	70	22	7	15	22	14
2014–15	Baie–Comeau Drakkar	QMJHL	16	6	12	18	22	—	—	—	—	—
2014–15	Gatineau Olympiques	QMJHL	26	15	13	28	38	11	3	4	7	20
2015–16	Ontario Reign	AHL	43	7	7	14	20	—	—	—	—	—
2015–16	Charlotte Checkers	AHL	2	0	0	0	0	—	—	—	—	—
2016–17	Charlotte Checkers	AHL	66	16	18	34	57	5	0	2	2	2
2016–17	Carolina Hurricanes	NHL	2	1	0	1	0	—	—	—	—	—
2017–18	Charlotte Checkers	AHL	63	33	21	54	45	8	4	2	6	8
2017–18	Carolina Hurricanes	NHL	10	3	4	7	2	—	—	—	—	—
2018–19	Carolina Hurricanes	NHL	13	0	3	3	0	—	—	—	—	—
2018–19	Charlotte Checkers	AHL	6	2	0	2	16	—	—	—	—	—
2018–19	Edmonton Oilers	NHL	5	0	0	0	2	—	—	—	—	—
2018–19	Vegas Golden Knights	NHL	10	2	0	2	0	—	—	—	—	—
2019–20	Vegas Golden Knights	NHL	15	1	3	4	6	—	—	—	—	—
2019–20	Chicago Wolves	AHL	29	10	5	15	22	—	—	—	—	—
2020–21	Modo Hockey	Allsv	7	2	2	4	8	—	—	—	—	—
2021–22	SKA Saint Petersburg	KHL	21	3	1	4	14	7	1	0	1	4
2022–23	SKA Saint Petersburg	KHL	54	8	16	24	16	16	1	2	3	6
2023–24	SKA Saint Petersburg	KHL	52	13	15	28	47	5	0	2	2	6
2024–25	SKA Saint Petersburg	KHL	56	15	14	29	55	6	2	0	2	6
2025–26	SKA Saint Petersburg	KHL	50	13	13	26	34	1	0	0	0	0
NHL totals			55	7	10	17	10	—	—	—	—	—
KHL totals			233	52	59	111	166	35	4	4	8	22

=== International ===
Year	Team	Event	Result	GP	G	A	Pts	PIM
2012	Russia	U17	1st place, gold medalist(s)	5	0	0	0	0
2014	Russia	WJC	3rd place, bronze medalist(s)	7	0	0	0	2
Junior totals				12	0	0	0	2

== Awards and honours ==
Award	Year
QMJHL
All-Rookie Team	2013
Rookie of the Year	2013
Michel Bergeron Trophy	2013
CHL Top Prospects Game	2013
CHL Rookie of the Year	2013
AHL
Willie Marshall Award	2018
