= Konrad Abeltshauser =

German ice hockey player (born 1992)

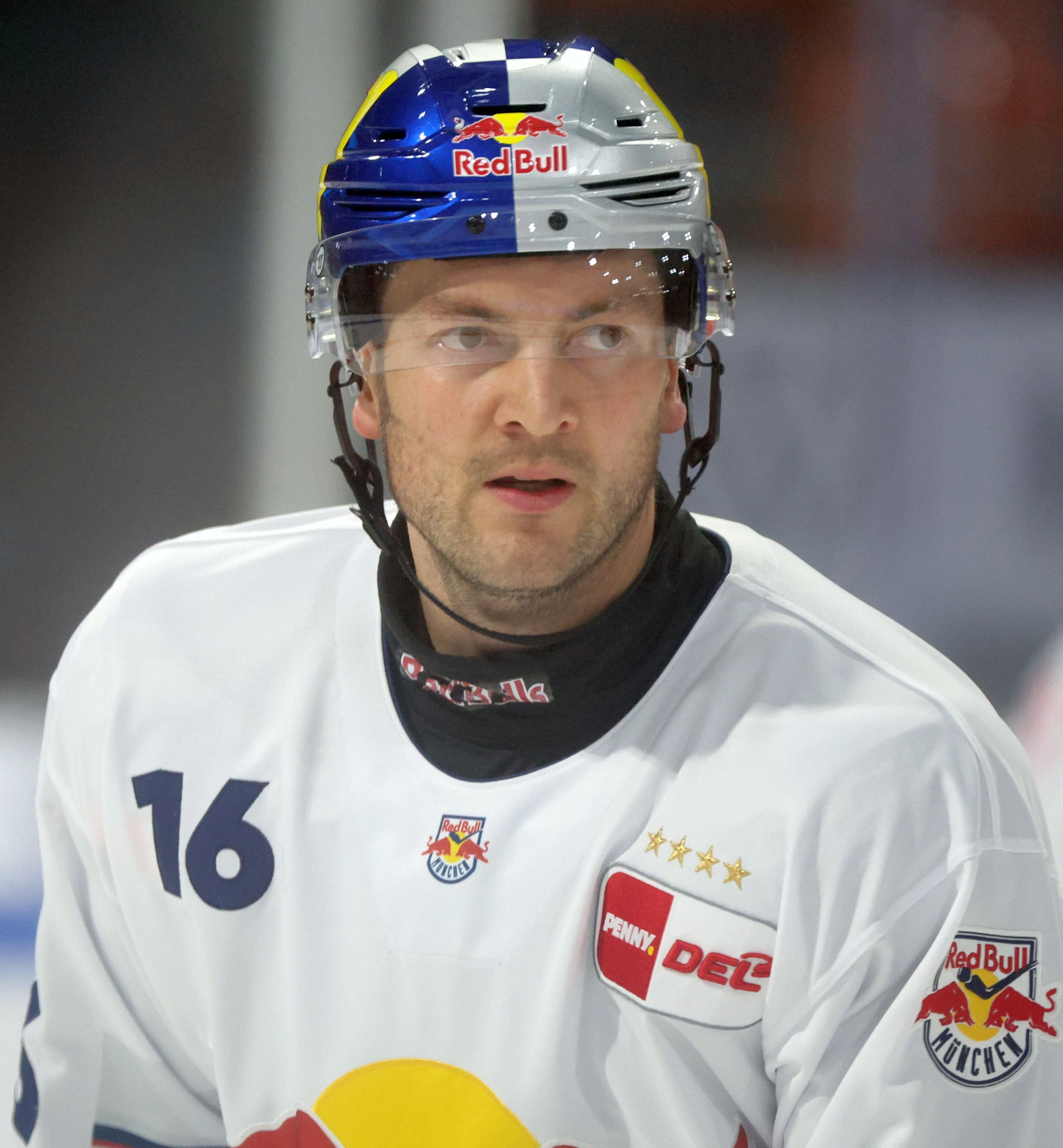
- Abeltshauser in 2024
- Born: 2 September 1992 (age 33) Bad Tölz, Germany
- Height: 6 ft 5 in (196 cm)
- Weight: 225 lb (102 kg; 16 st 1 lb)
- Position: Defence
- Shoots: Left
- DEL team: EHC München
- National team: Germany
- NHL draft: 163rd overall, 2010; San Jose Sharks
- Playing career: 2013–present

Konrad Abeltshauser (born 2 September 1992) is a German professional ice hockey defenceman for EHC Red Bull München of the Deutsche Eishockey Liga (DEL). Abeltshauser was selected by the San Jose Sharks in the 6th round (163rd overall) of the 2010 NHL entry draft.

== Playing career ==
Abeltshauser played four seasons (2009–2013) with the Halifax Mooseheads of the Quebec Major Junior Hockey League (QMJHL), where he registered 28 goals, 122 assists, and 127 penalty minutes, in 219 games played.

On 13 April 2012, the San Jose Sharks of the National Hockey League (NHL) signed Abeltshauser to an entry-level contract, but he did not make his professional debut until the 2013–14 season when he played 57 games for San Jose's AHL affiliate, the Worcester Sharks.

On 29 June 2015, Abeltshauser was traded by the Sharks to the St. Louis Blues in exchange for a conditional draft pick. He was assigned by the Blues to begin the 2015–16 season with AHL affiliate, the Chicago Wolves. After providing just five assists in 20 games with the Wolves, on 16 January 2016, Abeltshauser was placed on unconditional waivers by the Blues in order to mutually terminate the remainder of his NHL contract. Upon clearing, he returned to his native Germany, signing a contract with EHC Red Bull München of the Deutsche Eishockey Liga (DEL) on 20 January 2016. He received DEL Regular Season Defenceman of the Year honors in the 2016–17 campaign.

== Career statistics ==
=== Regular season and playoffs ===
			Regular season					Playoffs
Season	Team	League	GP	G	A	Pts	PIM	GP	G	A	Pts	PIM
2007–08	Tölzer Löwen	DNL	36	1	10	11	32	8	0	6	6	2
2008–09	Tölzer Löwen	DNL	36	16	28	44	24	4	1	0	1	2
2009–10	Halifax Mooseheads	QMJHL	48	5	20	25	28	—	—	—	—	—
2010–11	Halifax Mooseheads	QMJHL	58	8	19	27	47	4	3	0	3	0
2011–12	Halifax Mooseheads	QMJHL	57	8	36	44	30	15	5	11	16	16
2012–13	Halifax Mooseheads	QMJHL	56	7	47	54	22	17	7	13	20	12
2013–14	Worcester Sharks	AHL	57	6	15	21	18	—	—	—	—	—
2014–15	Worcester Sharks	AHL	50	3	16	19	19	—	—	—	—	—
2014–15	Allen Americans	ECHL	6	5	2	7	4	25	5	11	16	12
2015–16	Chicago Wolves	AHL	20	0	5	5	14	—	—	—	—	—
2015–16	EHC München	DEL	11	3	3	6	6	10	1	0	1	4
2016–17	EHC München	DEL	52	10	21	31	28	14	3	4	7	27
2017–18	EHC München	DEL	48	3	15	18	10	17	3	5	8	16
2018–19	EHC München	DEL	52	6	17	23	18	5	0	1	1	0
2019–20	EHC München	DEL	48	7	22	29	40	—	—	—	—	—
2020–21	EHC München	DEL	18	1	6	7	10	2	0	0	0	0
2021–22	EHC München	DEL	50	3	22	25	14	8	1	4	5	2
2022–23	EHC München	DEL	44	4	14	18	20	18	2	2	4	26
2023–24	EHC München	DEL	51	4	15	19	31	9	2	5	7	8
2024–25	EHC München	DEL	49	1	16	17	39	5	0	0	0	8
AHL totals			127	9	36	45	51	—	—	—	—	—
DEL totals			423	42	151	193	216	88	12	21	33	91

=== International ===
Year	Team	Event	Result	GP	G	A	Pts	PIM
2009	Germany	U17	6th	5	1	3	4	2
2009	Germany	U18	10th	6	0	0	0	2
2010	Germany	WJC D1	11th	5	0	4	4	6
2010	Germany	U18 D1	11th	5	2	9	11	4
2011	Germany	WJC	10th	6	0	0	0	2
2012	Germany	WJC D1A	11th	5	1	6	7	4
2017	Germany	WC	8th	8	0	0	0	0
2022	Germany	OG	10th	4	0	0	0	2
Junior totals				32	4	22	26	20
Senior totals				12	0	0	0	2

== Awards and honours ==
Award	Year	Ref
QMJHL
Second Team All-Star	2012–13	
Humanitarian of the Year	2012–13	
President's Cup champion	2012–13	
Memorial Cup Champion	2013	
Memorial Cup All-Star Team	2013	
AHL
Worcester Sharks Man of the Year	2013–14	
DEL
Defenseman of the Year	2016–17	
