= Xavier Ouellet =

Canadian ice hockey player (born 1993)

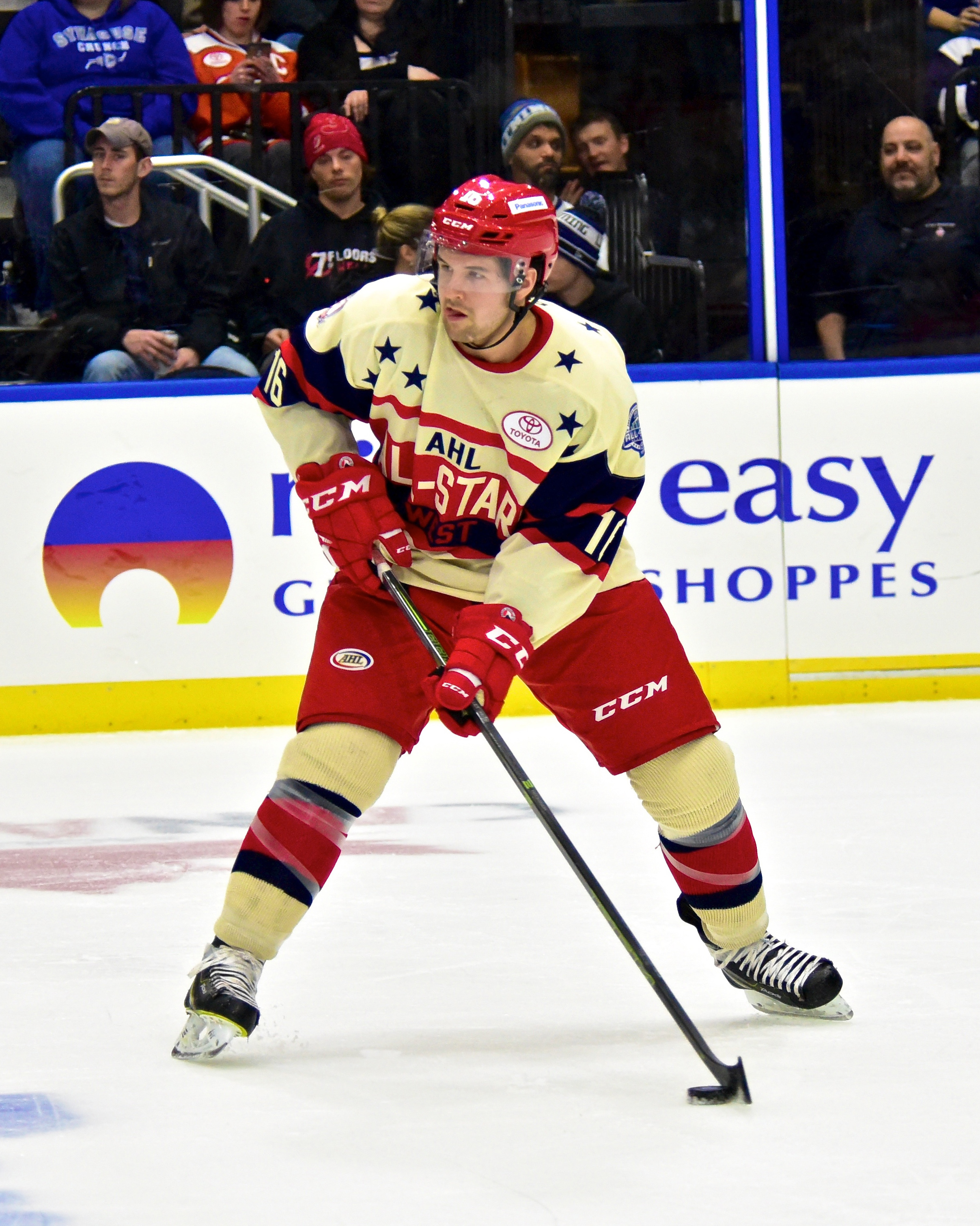
- Ouellet at the 2016 AHL All-Star Game
- Born: July 29, 1993 (age 33) Bayonne, France
- Height: 6 ft 0 in (183 cm)
- Weight: 196 lb (89 kg; 14 st 0 lb)
- Position: Defence
- Shoots: Left
- KHL team Former teams: Dinamo Minsk; Detroit Red Wings; Montreal Canadiens
- NHL draft: 48th overall, 2011; Detroit Red Wings
- Playing career: 2013–present

Xavier Ouellet (born July 29, 1993) is a French-born Canadian professional ice hockey defenceman who is currently playing for HC Dinamo Minsk of the Kontinental Hockey League (KHL). Ouellet was drafted 48th overall by the Detroit Red Wings in the 2011 NHL entry draft, and made his NHL debut with the team in 2013. Ouellet was born in Bayonne, France, but grew up in Terrebonne, Quebec.

== Playing career ==
As a youth, Ouellet played in the 2006 Quebec International Pee-Wee Hockey Tournament with a minor ice hockey team from Basses-Laurentides Ouest.

=== Junior ===
During the 2009–10 season, in his rookie season, Ouellet played in 43 games for the Montreal Juniors. Ouellet recorded two goals and 14 assists for 16 points. Ouellet recorded three assists in seven playoff games. Ouellet was named to the 2009-10 QMJHL's All-Rookie Team.

During the 2010–11 season, in 67 games for the Juniors, Ouellet recorded eight goals and 35 assists for 43 points. Ouellet recorded eight assists in 10 playoff games. Ouellet played for Team Orr at the 2011 CHL Home Hardware Top Prospects Game.

During the 2011–12 season, Ouellet was named a team captain for Blainville-Boisbriand, after the team re-located from Montreal. Ouellet was the re-christened Armada's second-leading scorer while playing a combative, physical defensive game. In his third QMJHL season he scored 21 goals with 39 assists in 63 games. Ten of his 21 goals were scored on the power play. The Armada finished first in the West Division and advanced to the second round of the playoffs. Ouellet scored three goals and seven assists in 11 playoff games. He was named to the QMJHL's first all-star team.

During the 2012–13 season, Ouellet returned to Blainville-Boisbriand for his fourth QMJHL season. A team captain for the Armada, he scored 10 goals and 31 assists in 50 games. Nine of his 10 goals were scored on the power play. Blainville-Boisbriand finished first in the West Division and reached the Western Conference finals. Ouellet scored seven goals and nine assists in 15 playoff games. Ouellet was rewarded for his outstanding play during the 2012–13 season by being named to the QMJHL's First All-Star Team for the second year in a row.

=== Professional ===
On March 25, 2012, the Detroit Red Wings signed Ouellet to a three-year entry-level contract.

During the 2013–14 season, in his first professional season with the Grand Rapids Griffins, Ouellet recorded four goals and 13 assists in 70 games. On October 21, 2013, Ouellet made his NHL debut for the Red Wings in a game against the San Jose Sharks.

During the 2014–15 season, Ouellet recorded one goal and 15 assists in 52 games with the Griffins, and was named to the 2015 AHL All-Star Classic. On November 28, 2014, Ouellet scored his first career NHL goal against Cory Schneider of the New Jersey Devils. In 21 games for the Red Wings, Ouellet recorded two goals and one assist.

On November 16, 2015, the Red Wings signed Ouellet to a one-year contract extension.

On December 19, 2015, Ouellet was recalled by the Red Wings. He was returned to the Griffins on December 23. Ouellet was named to the 2016 Toyota AHL All-Star Classic. On February 13, 2016, Ouellet was recalled by the Red Wings. On February 24, Ouellet was assigned to the Griffins. On April 20, Ouellet was recalled by the Red Wings. Prior to being recalled, he recorded four goals and 25 assists in 61 games with the Griffins. He was reassigned to the Griffins on April 21.

During the 2016–17 season, in his first full NHL season, Ouellet recorded three goals and nine assists in 66 games for the Red Wings. On July 3, 2017, the Red Wings signed Ouellet to a two-year contract extension.

In the following 2017–18 season, Ouellet recorded seven assists in 45 games. With his development having stagnated within the Red Wings organization, on June 24, 2018 the Red Wings waived Ouellet for the purpose of a contract buyout on the remaining year of his contract. On July 1, 2018, the Montreal Canadiens signed Ouellet to a one-year, two-way contract. Ouellet spent majority of the 2018–19 season with the Laval Rocket. In 47 games with the Rocket, he scoring seven goals and 21 assists. Ouellet also skated in 19 games with the Canadiens, recording three assists.

On May 27, 2019, the Canadiens re-signed Ouellet to a one-year, two-way contract worth $700,000. On October 9, 2020, the Canadiens re-signed Ouellet to a two-year, two-way contract worth $737,500.

After his fourth season within the Canadiens organization, Ouellet left as a free agent to sign a two-year, two-way contract with the Pittsburgh Penguins on July 13, 2022.

At the conclusion of his contract with the Penguins, Ouellet embarked on a career abroad by agreeing to a contract with Belarusian club, HC Dinamo Minsk of the KHL, on June 3, 2024. On February 25, 2025, Ouellet signed a two-year contract extension with Minsk, which is scheduled to run through the 2026–27 season.

== International play ==
Ouellet played for Team Quebec at the 2010 World U-17 Hockey Challenge, scoring one goal and one assist in five games.

Ouellet represented Canada at the 2013 World Junior Ice Hockey Championships. Ouellet was one of the top defencemen for Canada at the WJC, scoring a power play goal and two assists in six games. Canada was fourth in the tournament, losing to Russia in overtime in the bronze medal game.

== Personal life ==
Ouellet is the son of Robert Ouellet. He married Elizabeth Kranz on January 27, 2018. They had their first child in July 2017.

== Career statistics ==
=== Regular season and playoffs ===
			Regular season					Playoffs
Season	Team	League	GP	G	A	Pts	PIM	GP	G	A	Pts	PIM
2009–10	Montreal Junior Hockey Club	QMJHL	43	2	14	16	22	7	0	3	3	12
2010–11	Montreal Junior Hockey Club	QMJHL	67	8	35	43	44	10	0	8	8	6
2011–12	Blainville-Boisbriand Armada	QMJHL	63	21	39	60	67	11	3	7	10	14
2012–13	Blainville-Boisbriand Armada	QMJHL	50	10	31	41	44	15	7	9	16	22
2013–14	Grand Rapids Griffins	AHL	70	4	13	17	22	8	0	0	0	4
2013–14	Detroit Red Wings	NHL	4	0	0	0	2	1	0	0	0	0
2014–15	Grand Rapids Griffins	AHL	52	1	15	16	24	16	1	5	6	8
2014–15	Detroit Red Wings	NHL	21	2	1	3	2	—	—	—	—	—
2015–16	Grand Rapids Griffins	AHL	61	4	25	29	66	9	2	2	4	6
2015–16	Detroit Red Wings	NHL	5	0	1	1	2	—	—	—	—	—
2016–17	Detroit Red Wings	NHL	66	3	9	12	51	—	—	—	—	—
2017–18	Detroit Red Wings	NHL	45	0	7	7	6	—	—	—	—	—
2018–19	Montreal Canadiens	NHL	19	0	3	3	13	—	—	—	—	—
2018–19	Laval Rocket	AHL	47	7	21	28	20	—	—	—	—	—
2019–20	Laval Rocket	AHL	39	9	15	24	13	—	—	—	—	—
2019–20	Montreal Canadiens	NHL	12	0	2	2	4	10	0	1	1	14
2020–21	Laval Rocket	AHL	19	3	1	4	11	—	—	—	—	—
2020–21	Montreal Canadiens	NHL	6	0	0	0	2	—	—	—	—	—
2021–22	Laval Rocket	AHL	61	8	33	41	47	15	1	8	9	10
2022–23	Wilkes-Barre/Scranton Penguins	AHL	29	2	15	17	21	—	—	—	—	—
2023–24	Wilkes-Barre/Scranton Penguins	AHL	63	2	23	25	31	2	0	0	0	4
2024–25	Dinamo Minsk	KHL	68	3	25	28	30	11	0	6	6	10
2025–26	Dinamo Minsk	KHL	46	6	18	24	18	8	0	2	2	9
NHL totals			178	5	23	28	82	11	0	1	1	14

=== International ===
Year	Team	Event	Result	GP	G	A	Pts	PIM
2013	Canada	WJC	4th	6	1	2	3	2
Junior totals				6	1	2	3	2

== Awards and honours ==
Award	Year
QMJHL
All-Rookie Team	2010
First All-Star Team	2012, 2013
AHL
All-Star Game	2015, 2016
