= Nick Sörensen =

Danish-born Swedish ice hockey player (born 1994)

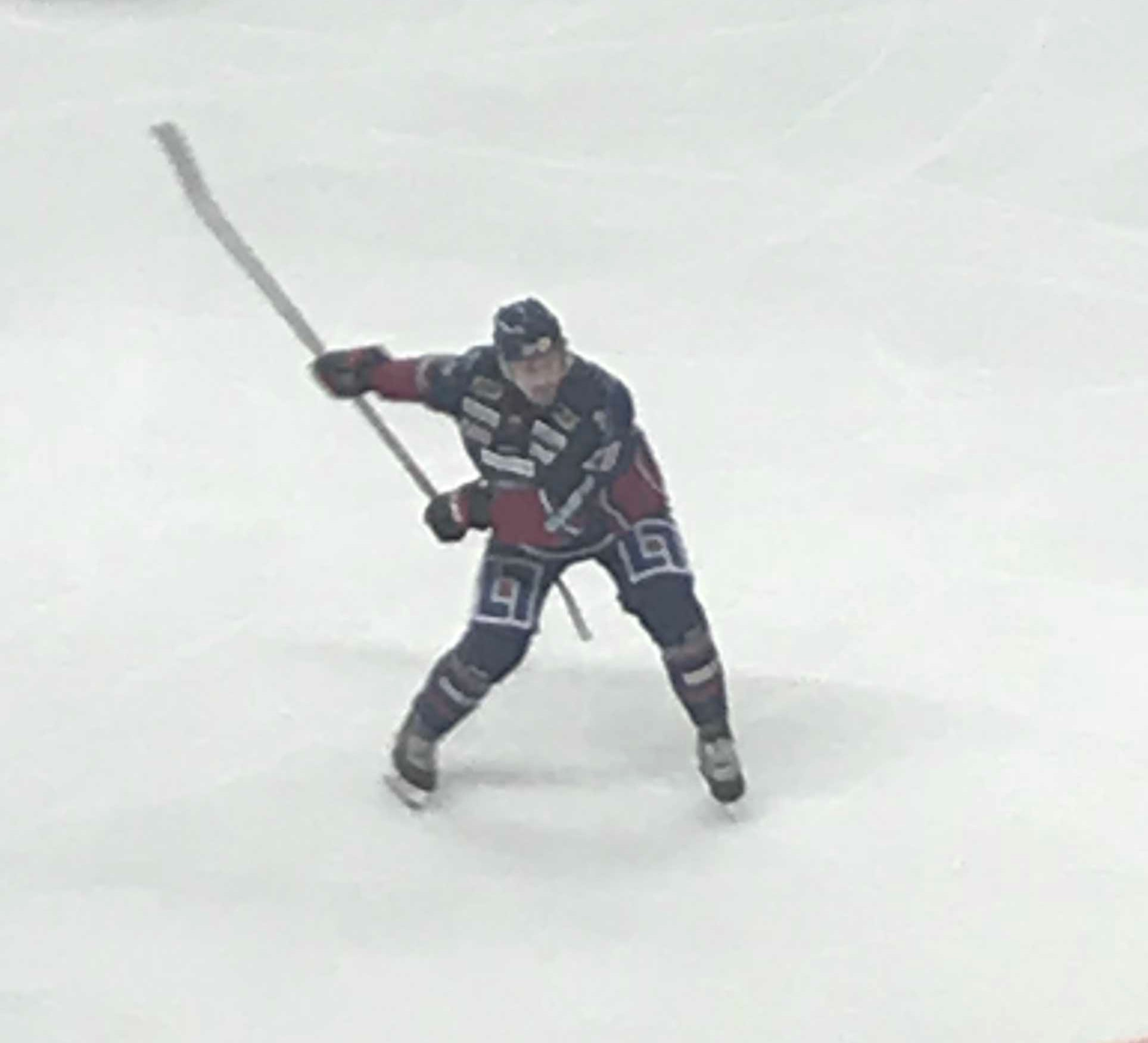
- Sörensen with Linköping HC in 2018
- Born: October 23, 1994 (age 31) Holbæk, Denmark
- Height: 6 ft 2 in (188 cm)
- Weight: 198 lb (90 kg; 14 st 2 lb)
- Position: Right wing
- Shot: Right
- Played for: Rögle BK; Skellefteå AIK; Linköping HC; Anaheim Ducks
- NHL draft: 45th overall, 2013; Anaheim Ducks
- Playing career: 2011–2020

Nick Sörensen (born October 23, 1994) is a Danish-born Swedish former professional ice hockey right wing who played in the Swedish Hockey League (SHL) and with the Anaheim Ducks in the National Hockey League (NHL). He was drafted by the Ducks in the 2013 NHL entry draft, 45th overall.

== Playing career ==
Sörensen played as a youth and made his professional debut with Rögle BK in the HockeyAllsvenskan. In order to pursue an NHL career, he moved to North America and played as an import in the Quebec Major Junior Hockey League with the Quebec Remparts before getting drafted 45th overall in the 2013 NHL Entry Draft by the Anaheim Ducks. On April 3, 2014, Sörensen signed to a three-year entry-level contract with the Anaheim Ducks.

Sörensen made his Swedish Hockey League debut during the 2014–15 season with Skellefteå AIK before transferring to fellow participant Linköpings HC for the 2015–16 season on loan from the Ducks.

In the 2016–17 season, having returned to North America, Sörensen made the opening night roster out of training camp. He made his debut with the Ducks against the Dallas Stars on October 13, 2016. He recorded his first NHL point, an assist against the Philadelphia Flyers on October 20, 2016. Two days later and having appeared in 5 games with Anaheim, Sörensen was re-assigned to American Hockey League affiliate, the San Diego Gulls. He played the remainder of the season in San Diego, collecting 22 points in 48 games.

In the off-season, Sörensen opted to leave the Ducks and return to previous club, Linköpings HC of the SHL, in signing a two-year contract on May 23, 2017. Returning for a third season with Linköpings HC, Sörensen was scoreless in 6 games to begin the 2019 – 20 season, before leaving the club and opting to return to original club, Rögle BK, for the remainder of the SHL season on September 29, 2019. He registered 5 points through 15 games with Rögle BK, before suffering a season ending concussion on November 28, 2019.

Having suffered his seventh recorded concussion through his career, leading to injuries to his eyes, and on-set depression, Sörensen announced his retirement from professional hockey after 9 seasons.

== International play ==
He has represented Sweden in 2013 and 2014, getting two World Junior Championship silver medals.

== Career statistics ==
=== Regular season and playoffs ===
			Regular season					Playoffs
Season	Team	League	GP	G	A	Pts	PIM	GP	G	A	Pts	PIM
2010–11	Rögle BK	J20	35	10	14	24	14	9	2	4	6	4
2010–11	Rögle BK	Allsv	6	0	0	0	2	—	—	—	—	—
2011–12	Quebec Remparts	QMJHL	8	5	4	9	2	—	—	—	—	—
2012–13	Quebec Remparts	QMJHL	46	20	27	47	18	8	7	3	10	10
2013–14	Quebec Remparts	QMJHL	44	31	30	61	43	5	6	3	9	8
2014–15	Skellefteå AIK	SHL	14	1	3	4	4	8	0	0	0	2
2015–16	Linköping HC	SHL	37	10	13	23	37	6	0	3	3	2
2016–17	Anaheim Ducks	NHL	5	0	1	1	2	—	—	—	—	—
2016–17	San Diego Gulls	AHL	48	10	12	22	38	8	2	2	4	8
2017–18	Linköping HC	SHL	37	14	8	22	14	4	0	1	1	4
2018–19	Linköping HC	SHL	34	14	9	23	22	—	—	—	—	—
2019–20	Linköping HC	SHL	6	0	0	0	4	—	—	—	—	—
2019–20	Rögle BK	SHL	15	1	4	5	4	—	—	—	—	—
SHL totals			148	40	37	77	85	18	0	4	4	8
NHL totals			5	0	1	1	2	—	—	—	—	—

=== International ===
Year	Team	Event	Result	GP	G	A	Pts	PIM
2013	Sweden	WJC	2nd place, silver medalist(s)	6	0	0	0	2
2014	Sweden	WJC	2nd place, silver medalist(s)	7	2	4	6	4
Junior totals				13	2	4	6	6
