= Dillon Fournier =

Canadian ice hockey defenceman

- Born: June 15, 1994 (age 32) Dorval, Quebec, Canada
- Height: 6 ft 2 in (188 cm)
- Weight: 181 lb (82 kg; 12 st 13 lb)
- Position: Defence
- Shoots: Left
- SPHL team Former teams: Quad City Storm; Rockford IceHogs
- NHL draft: 48th overall, 2012; Chicago Blackhawks
- Playing career: 2014–present

Dillon Fournier (born June 15, 1994) is a Canadian ice hockey defenceman currently playing for the Quad City Storm of the SPHL. He formerly played for the Indy Fuel in the ECHL and the Rockford IceHogs of the American Hockey League (AHL). Fournier was selected by the Chicago Blackhawks in the 2nd round (48th overall) of the 2012 NHL entry draft.

== Playing career ==
Fournier was picked first overall by the Lewiston Maineiacs in the 2010 QMJHL Entry Draft, and competed with Team Quebec at the 2011 World U-17 Hockey Challenge. After one season he was selected first overall by the Rouyn-Noranda Huskies in the QMJHL dispersal draft after the Lewiston Maineiacs folded. He was recognized for his outstanding play when he was chosen for the 2012 CHL Top Prospects Game.

On March 10, 2014, the Chicago Blackhawks of the National Hockey League signed Fournier to a three-year entry-level contract.

On June 8, 2017, Fournier retired from professional hockey due to a chronic shoulder injury that limited him to only 13 games between the AHL and ECHL over the past two years.

== Awards and honours ==
Award	Year
World U-17 Hockey Challenge	2011
CHL/NHL Top Prospects Game	2011–12
