= Serge Proulx =

Canadian cyclist

Personal information
- Born: 8 July 1953 (age 73) Quebec City, Quebec, Canada

Cycling career
- Sport: Cycling

Serge Proulx (born 8 July 1953) is a former Canadian cyclist. He competed in the team time trial event at the 1976 Summer Olympics.
