= Alexandre Lavoie =

Canadian ice hockey player (born 1992)

Alex Lavoie
- Born: November 17, 1992 (age 33) Anjou, Quebec, Canada
- Height: 5 ft 11 in (180 cm)
- Weight: 181 lb (82 kg; 12 st 13 lb)
- Position: Centre
- Shoots: Right
- EIHL team Former teams: Guildford Flames; Oklahoma City Barons; BIK Karlskoga; KalPa; Timrå IK; HC TWK Innsbruck; Frisk Asker; HC Vita Hästen; HK Olimpija
- NHL draft: Undrafted
- Playing career: 2013–present

Alexandre Lavoie (born November 17, 1992) is a Canadian professional ice hockey player. He is currently playing with Guildford Flames of the Elite Ice Hockey League.

== Playing career ==
Lavoie started playing in Chicoutimi Saguenéens in the Quebec Major Junior Hockey League (QMJHL) from 2008 to 2011 followed by a season in the same league's Cape Breton Screaming Eagles and one more season in the league's Rimouski Oceanic.

He then moved to play on the Allen Americans in the Central Hockey League (CHL) for two seasons including a loan assignment to American Hockey League club, the Oklahoma City Barons. Lavoie was voted Best of the "Best Rookie of the Year" in 2014. After 7 games with the Barons, he returned to the Allen Americans to help capture the Ray Miron Cup.

On August 1, 2014, Lavoie opted to move to the ECHL, signing a one-year deal with the Florida Everblades. In the 2014–15 season, Lavoie was the main offensive threat for the Everblades, registering 57 points in 67 games.

On September 23, 2015, Lavoie's rights were traded to the Indy Fuel. He signed a one-year contract with the club to remain in the ECHL. In 71 games with the Fuel, Lavoie was amongst the team's offensive leaders with 38 assists and 54 points.

As a free agent in the following off-season, Lavoie opted to sign abroad in Sweden, agreeing to a one-year deal with second-tier club BIK Karlskoga of the HockeyAllsvenskan on August 24, 2016.

After four European seasons, Lavoie opted to return to North America during the COVID-19 pandemic. He agreed to a contract to resume his career in the ECHL with his former club, the Allen Americans, on November 4, 2020. He added 6 assists through 12 games in the 2020–21 season before ending his contract after securing a contract in Sweden with second-tier club, HC Vita Hästen of the Allsvenskan on January 26, 2021.

== Awards and honours ==
Award	Year
CHL All-Rookie Team	2013–14
CHL Rookie of the Year	2013–14
