= Derrick Pouliot =

Canadian ice hockey player (born 1994)

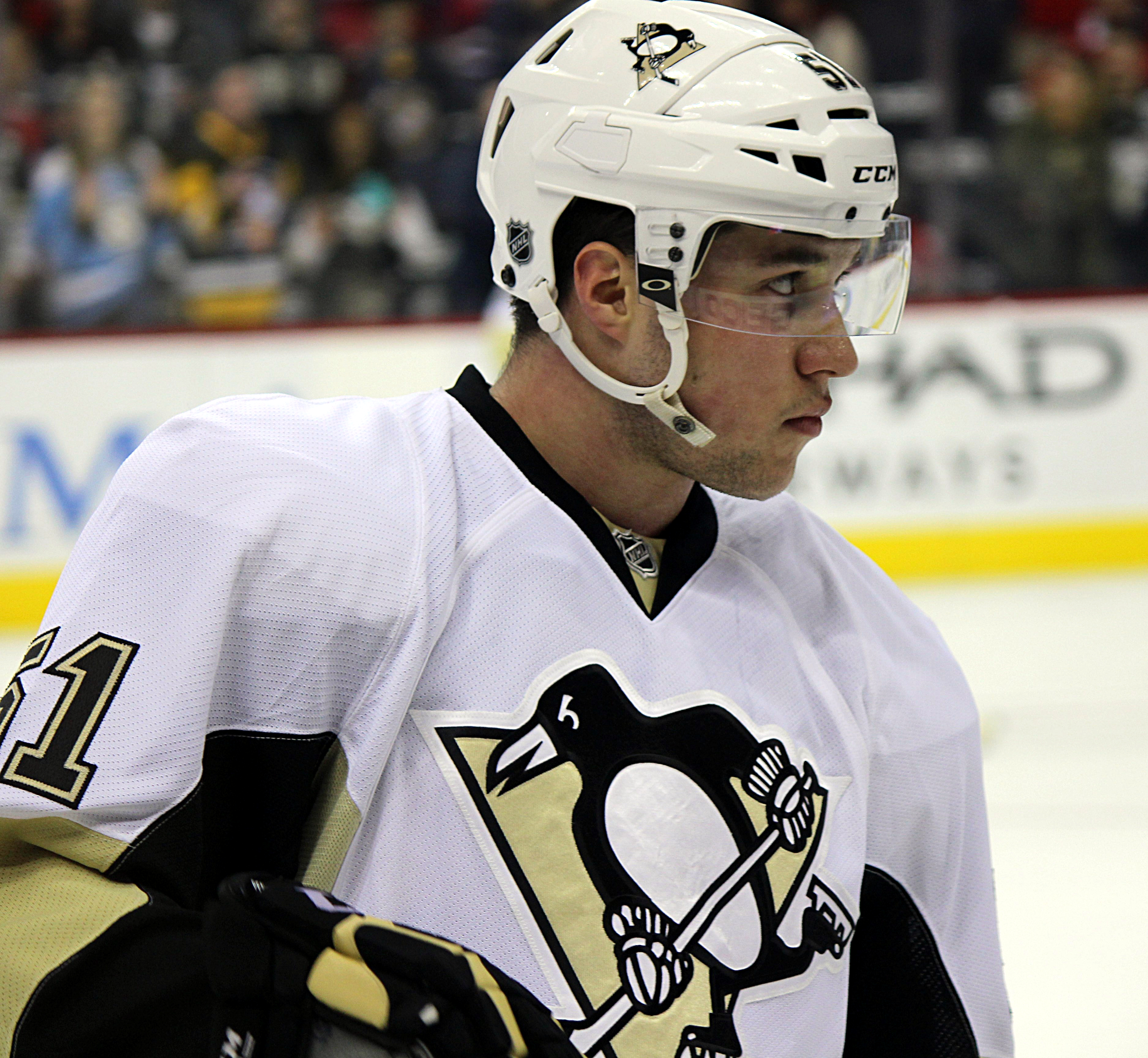
- Pouliot with the Pittsburgh Penguins in 2016
- Born: January 16, 1994 (age 32) Estevan, Saskatchewan, Canada
- Height: 6 ft 0 in (183 cm)
- Weight: 208 lb (94 kg; 14 st 12 lb)
- Position: Defence
- Shoots: Left
- NHL team (P) Cur. team Former teams: Chicago Blackhawks; Rockford IceHogs (AHL); Pittsburgh Penguins; Vancouver Canucks; St. Louis Blues; Vegas Golden Knights; Seattle Kraken; San Jose Sharks; Dallas Stars
- NHL draft: 8th overall, 2012; Pittsburgh Penguins
- Playing career: 2013–present

Derrick Pouliot (born January 16, 1994) is a Canadian professional ice hockey player who is a defenceman for the Rockford IceHogs of the American Hockey League (AHL) while under contract to the Chicago Blackhawks of the National Hockey League (NHL). He has previously played in the NHL for the Pittsburgh Penguins, Vancouver Canucks, St. Louis Blues, Vegas Golden Knights, Seattle Kraken, San Jose Sharks, and Dallas Stars. Pouliot was selected eighth overall in the 2012 NHL entry draft by the Penguins.

== Playing career ==
=== Midget ===
Pouliot made his appearance at the midget level for the Moose Jaw Warriors Midget AAA of the SMAAAHL in 2008–09 with a short, five-game stint, though he still qualified to play in bantam at the time. A highly regarded prospect, Pouliot was selected with the first overall pick in the 2009 WHL bantam draft by the Portland Winterhawks, who placed him on their protected list. Pouliot then rejoined Moose Jaw for the full season in 2009–10, finishing as a point-per-game player (14 goals and 29 assists). Pouliot finished fourth on his team in scoring and as the top-scoring defenceman. During the course of the season, Pouliot found time to play for the Winterhawks, first in January and again after the Warriors were eliminated, recording a single assist in seven games, as he played against players who were three to four years his senior.

=== Major junior ===
==== 2010–11 ====
Pouliot joined the Winterhawks for the 2010–11 season. On a team laden with talent (2010 fourth- and fifth-overall picks Ryan Johansen and Nino Niederreiter, along with future first-round picks in 2011 Sven Bärtschi and Joe Morrow), Pouliot played the majority of the season and finished with 30 points in 66 games. During the season, Pouliot was invited to play for Canada-West at the 2011 World U-17 Hockey Challenge, finishing with three assists in five games as Canada-West lost in the fifth-place game to Canada-Atlantic. Portland finished the regular season with 103 points in the standings, finishing one point ahead of U.S. Division rival Spokane to clinch the top spot in the Western Conference.

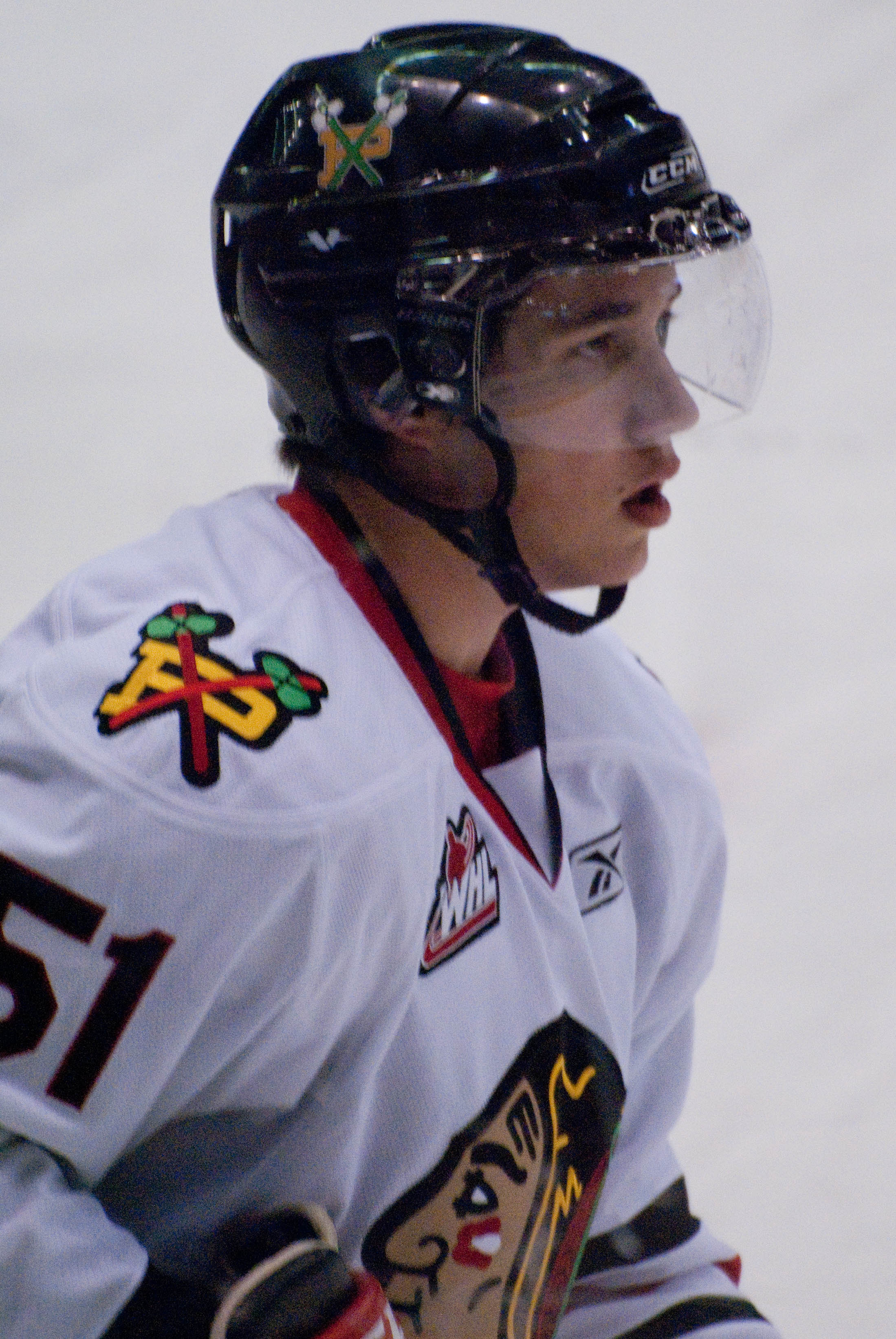
Pouliot with the Winterhawks in 2010

In an opening-round sweep of the Everett Silvertips, Pouliot scored a goal in the 7–2 Game 2 rout, his only point of the series. Following a win in the conference semifinals against the B.C. Division champion Kelowna Rockets, the Winterhawks lost 4–1 to the Kootenay Ice. Pouliot posted an assist in each of Portland's first two games in the series, including a helper on Ty Rattie's overtime power play game-winner in Game 1. While Portland had a successful playoffs, Pouliot's 4 points in 21 games were considered disappointing after a regular season in which he had averaged a half-point per game. Over the summer, Pouliot was a member of Canada's gold-medal team at the 2011 Ivan Hlinka Memorial Tournament.

==== 2011–12 ====
Pouliot entered his draft year with a four-assist night in only his second game of the season and while his output dipped as the season went along, he was performing much better in his second full season with the Winterhawks. Despite being omitted from Canada's roster for the 2012 World Junior Ice Hockey Championships, Pouliot was listed in the top-ten of North American skaters by NHL Central Scouting in the mid-season rankings, though once again not as the top defenceman. Pouliot finished the season with 59 points, almost doubling his output from the season before, while playing in all 72 of Portland's games. The Winterhawks again had a stellar season, ending up as the most prolific offensive team in the WHL, due in part to Pouliot's scoring prowess.

Portland swept their opening round playoff series against the Kelowna Rockets, in which Pouliot produced two assists, and defeated the Kamloops Blazers to move on to the conference finals against the Tri-City Americans, a match-up which pitted the top offensive and defensive teams in the WHL against one another. In another four-game sweep of the Americans, Pouliot put up a 4-assist performance in Game 2, assisting on each of the Winterhawks' goals except the overtime game-winner. In their second consecutive finals appearance, the Winterhawks were matched up against the Edmonton Oil Kings, who finished the regular season with the best record in the WHL. Portland lost the series in seven games, and Pouliot, who had been effective in the first five games of the series, was silent in the last two, including being on the ice for two of Edmonton's goals in Game 7.

Despite the outcome, Pouliot produced 17 points in 22 games during the playoffs. The final Central Scouting rankings placed him as the 12th-ranked North American skater. The draft host Pittsburgh Penguins selected Pouliot with the eighth overall selection, which they had obtained from the Carolina Hurricanes in the Jordan Staal trade when Pittsburgh had their own first-round selection at 22nd overall (Olli Määttä). Less than one week later, Pouliot was invited to Canada's National Development Camp, the first stepping stone in joining the 2013 WJC roster. A few months later, Pouliot signed a three-year, entry-level contract with Pittsburgh just a few days before the 2012–13 NHL lockout was to begin.

==== 2012–13 ====
With the departure of fellow Penguins draft pick Joe Morrow to the American Hockey League (AHL), Pouliot became the Winterhawks' star offensive defenceman and immediately rose to the challenge. Pouliot took charge of the power play and increased his scoring. By the end of November, Pouliot had posted 24 points in 26 games, including five- and six-game point streaks, earning him an invitation to Canada's World Junior Championship selection camp alongside fellow Penguins prospect Scott Harrington. However, after the second day of the camp, Pouliot was returned to Portland. Upon his return to the WHL, Pouliot immediately produced a three-assist game and finished with 12 points in the month of December.

In the third game back in January, Pouliot suffered a high ankle sprain (unreported at the time) and would miss time intermittently over the next few months. Nevertheless, he finished the regular season with 45 points in 44 games. Portland finished with the best record in the WHL (57–12–1–2) along with the top offence in the league and the best defence in the conference. In a five-game opening series win over the Everett Silvertips, Pouliot finished with nine points (six coming on the power play) as well as assisting on the game-winner in the deciding match.

In a second round sweep of the Spokane Chiefs, the Winterhawks scored 18 goals and allowed only 3, and Pouliot recorded a four-point night in the opening match. A win over the Kamloops Blazers in the conference finals propelled the Winterhawks into the WHL finals for the third straight season. Portland won in six games, during which Pouliot posted four assists, finishing the playoffs with 20 points in 21 games to lead all defencemen in playoff scoring.

Despite a disappointing loss to the Halifax Mooseheads in the Memorial Cup Final, Pouliot's seven points led all defencemen for the tournament. After the Winterhawks finished for the season, Pouliot joined the Pittsburgh Penguins' AHL affiliate, the Wilkes-Barre/Scranton Penguins, for their last game of the 2013 Calder Cup playoffs.

==== 2013–14 ====
Pouliot returned to the WHL for the 2013–14 WHL season, allowing him to compete for the Canadian WJC roster at the 2014 World Junior Ice Hockey Championships in Malmö, Sweden, and the WHL Finals, before embarking on his professional career. In Malmö, they lost the Bronze Final 1-2 to Russia, after losing to Silver Medalists Finland 1-5 in the Semis. Canada led Group "A" in the preliminary rounds with three wins, and a shoot-out loss. He assisted on two of the 3 game winning-goals, against Slovakia and USA. The Winterhawks were second-place in the WHL Western Conference, trailing leaders Kelowna Rockets by 5 points (113-118), and exceeded Eastern leaders Edmonton Oil Kings and Calgary Hitmen by 10 points. In the playoffs, he shone on the scoreboard, placing third in the league (five Winterhawks led playoff scoring) with 5 goals and league-leading 27 assists. He was a WHL Western Division First team all star, and won the Bill Hunter Memorial Trophy as WHL's top Defenceman, and the Canadian Hockey League Defenceman of the Year. Unfortunately, the Winterhawks couldn't defend their WHL Championship losing the WHL Finals in seven games, to the 2014 Memorial Cup champion Oil Kings.

=== Professional ===
==== Pittsburgh Penguins ====
On October 21, 2014, Pouliot was assigned to the Wilkes-Barre/Scranton Penguins of the AHL by the Pittsburgh Penguins. On December 20, 2014, during a rash of injuries to the Penguins defencemen, Pouliot was recalled for the first time in his career and subsequently made his NHL debut, also scoring his first NHL goal on his first shot against Roberto Luongo of the Florida Panthers. For having appeared in 2 playoff games for the Penguins in 2016, he qualified to have his name engraved on the Stanley Cup as member of the 2016 champion Pittsburgh Penguins.

==== Vancouver Canucks ====
On October 3, 2017, Pouliot was traded to the Vancouver Canucks in exchange for Andrey Pedan and a 2018 fourth-round pick. He scored his first goal with the Canucks on November 22, scoring the game-winner in a 5–2 road win over his former team, the Pittsburgh Penguins. On March 29, 2018, after scoring his fifth career goal in a 2–1 Canucks victory over the Edmonton Oilers, Pouliot set an NHL record for most goals scored from the start of a career, with all of them being game-winning goals. Pouliot further extended this with a sixth game-winning goal against the Colorado Avalanche on November 2, 2018. On June 26, the Canucks re-signed Pouliot to a one-year, $1.1 million contract.

On May 8, 2019, it was announced the Canucks would not offer impending restricted free agent Pouliot a qualifying offer which was formalised on June 25, 2019. He was released as a free agent, ending his two-season tenure in Vancouver.

==== St. Louis Blues ====
On July 1, 2019, Pouliot was signed to a one-year, two-way contract with the St. Louis Blues. Giving the Blues added organizational depth on the blueline, Pouliot was assigned to the San Antonio Rampage of the AHL for the majority of the 2019–20 season. He added 7 goals and 32 assists to finish sixth among all AHL defenseman with 39 points. He was briefly recalled by the Blue and added two games to his NHL resume. With the Rampage season ended due to the COVID-19 pandemic, Pouliot as an impending restricted free agent was not tendered a qualifying offer by the Blues, making him a free agent for the second consecutive year.

==== Philadelphia Flyers ====
On October 9, 2020, Pouliot joined his fourth NHL outfit in agreeing to a one-year, two-way contract with the Philadelphia Flyers. In the shortened 2020–21 season, Pouliot never made an appearance with the Flyers, and was assigned for the duration of the season to AHL affiliate, the Lehigh Valley Phantoms, tallying 3 goals and 14 points through 25 regular season games.

==== Vegas Golden Knights ====
As a free agent from the Flyers, Pouliot was initially signed to a one-year, AHL contract with the Henderson Silver Knights, affiliate to the Vegas Golden Knights on July 31, 2021. In the 2021–22 season, Pouliot posted 2 goals and 19 points in 42 games with the Silver Knights, before he was signed to a one-year, two-way contract with the Vegas Golden Knights on March 17, 2022. Pouliot registered 1 assist in 2 appearances with the Golden Knights.

==== Seattle Kraken ====
On March 21, 2022, Pouliot's brief tenure with the Golden Knights ended after he was claimed off waivers by fellow expansion club, the Seattle Kraken. He played out the remainder of the season on the Kraken roster, registering 3 assists through 9 regular season games.

==== San Jose Sharks ====
As a free agent from the Kraken, Pouliot returned to the AHL in signing a one-year contract with the San Jose Barracuda, the primary affiliate of the San Jose Sharks, on August 10, 2022. As an alternate captain with the Barracuda for the 2022–23 season, Pouliot adding a veteran presence posted 18 points through 26 games before on March 2, 2022, he signed a one-year, two-way NHL deal with the San Jose Sharks for the remainder of the season.

==== Dallas Stars ====
In the following off-season, Pouliot continued his journeyman career by agreeing to a one-year, two-way contract with the Dallas Stars for the 2023–24 season on July 4, 2023.

==== Tampa Bay Lightning ====
After a lone season with the Stars, Pouliot left to sign a one-year, two-way contract with his eighth NHL club, the Tampa Bay Lightning, on July 1, 2024. In his first season playing with the AHL affiliate Syracuse Crunch, he registered 53 points in 69 games, and was named to the league's First All-Star Team.

==== New York Rangers ====
As a free agent from the Lightning, Pouliot was again on the move, signing a two-year, $1.55 million contract with the New York Rangers on July 1, 2025.

==== Chicago Blackhawks ====
On March 6, 2026, Pouliot was traded to the Chicago Blackhawks in exchange for Aidan Thompson.

== Career statistics ==
=== Regular season and playoffs ===
			Regular season					Playoffs
Season	Team	League	GP	G	A	Pts	PIM	GP	G	A	Pts	PIM
2008–09	Moose Jaw Warriors Midget AAA	SMAAAHL	5	1	1	2	0	—	—	—	—	—
2009–10	Moose Jaw Warriors Midget AAA	SMAAAHL	43	14	29	43	38	4	0	2	2	4
2009–10	Portland Winterhawks	WHL	7	0	1	1	0	—	—	—	—	—
2010–11	Portland Winterhawks	WHL	66	5	25	30	38	21	1	3	4	16
2011–12	Portland Winterhawks	WHL	72	11	48	59	79	22	3	14	17	18
2012–13	Portland Winterhawks	WHL	44	9	36	45	60	21	4	16	20	12
2012–13	Wilkes-Barre/Scranton Penguins	AHL	—	—	—	—	—	1	0	0	0	0
2013–14	Portland Winterhawks	WHL	58	17	53	70	74	21	5	27	32	13
2014–15	Wilkes-Barre/Scranton Penguins	AHL	31	7	17	24	20	6	1	2	3	2
2014–15	Pittsburgh Penguins	NHL	34	2	5	7	4	—	—	—	—	—
2015–16	Wilkes-Barre/Scranton Penguins	AHL	37	6	17	23	26	—	—	—	—	—
2015–16	Pittsburgh Penguins	NHL	22	0	7	7	2	2	0	0	0	2
2016–17	Pittsburgh Penguins	NHL	11	0	0	0	4	—	—	—	—	—
2016–17	Wilkes-Barre/Scranton Penguins	AHL	46	7	16	23	26	5	1	1	2	2
2017–18	Vancouver Canucks	NHL	71	3	19	22	39	—	—	—	—	—
2018–19	Vancouver Canucks	NHL	63	3	9	12	30	—	—	—	—	—
2019–20	San Antonio Rampage	AHL	58	7	32	39	34	—	—	—	—	—
2019–20	St. Louis Blues	NHL	2	0	0	0	2	—	—	—	—	—
2020–21	Lehigh Valley Phantoms	AHL	25	3	11	14	20	—	—	—	—	—
2021–22	Henderson Silver Knights	AHL	42	2	17	19	36	—	—	—	—	—
2021–22	Vegas Golden Knights	NHL	2	0	1	1	2	—	—	—	—	—
2021–22	Seattle Kraken	NHL	9	0	3	3	2	—	—	—	—	—
2022–23	San Jose Barracuda	AHL	37	4	21	25	46	—	—	—	—	—
2022–23	San Jose Sharks	NHL	8	0	2	2	6	—	—	—	—	—
2023–24	Texas Stars	AHL	64	9	37	46	59	—	—	—	—	—
2023–24	Dallas Stars	NHL	5	0	0	0	0	—	—	—	—	—
2024–25	Syracuse Crunch	AHL	70	7	46	53	36	3	0	0	0	12
2025–26	Hartford Wolf Pack	AHL	52	2	26	28	34	—	—	—	—	—
2025–26	Rockford IceHogs	AHL	16	0	6	6	0	—	—	—	—	—
NHL totals			226	8	46	54	91	2	0	0	0	2

=== International ===
Year	Team	Event	Result	GP	G	A	Pts	PIM
2011	Canada Western	U17	6th	5	0	3	3	2
2011	Canada	IH18	1st place, gold medalist(s)	5	2	1	3	4
2014	Canada	WJC	4th	7	1	4	5	8
Junior totals				17	3	8	11	14

== Awards and honours ==
Award	Year
First overall pick in the WHL bantam draft	2009
World U-17 Hockey Challenge Tournament All-Star Team	2011
Ivan Hlinka Memorial Tournament Gold Medal with Team Canada	2011
NHL Research, Development and Orientation Camp	2011
CHL Top Prospects Game – Team Orr	2012
Ed Chynoweth Cup Champion – Portland Winterhawks	2013
CHL Memorial Cup All-Star Team	2013
WHL First All-Star Team (West)	2013–14
CHL Defenceman of the Year	2013–14
Stanley Cup champion	2016
AHL First All-Star Team	2024–25

Awards and achievements
Preceded by Joe Morrow	Pittsburgh Penguins first-round draft pick 2012	Succeeded by Olli Määttä
