= Seth Jones =

American ice hockey player (born 1994)

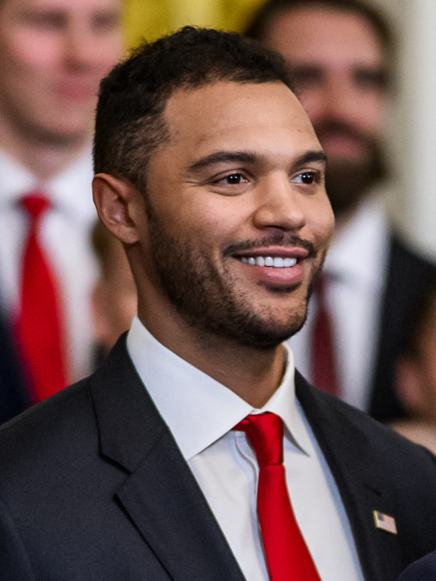
- Jones at the White House in 2026
- Born: October 3, 1994 (age 32) Arlington, Texas, U.S.
- Height: 6 ft 4 in (193 cm)
- Weight: 220 lb (100 kg; 15 st 10 lb)
- Position: Defense
- Shoots: Right
- NHL team Former teams: Florida Panthers; Nashville Predators; Columbus Blue Jackets; Chicago Blackhawks
- National team: United States
- NHL draft: 4th overall, 2013; Nashville Predators
- Playing career: 2013–present

Jared Seth Jones (born October 3, 1994) is an American professional ice hockey player who is a defenseman for the Florida Panthers of the National Hockey League (NHL). He was selected fourth overall by the Nashville Predators in the 2013 NHL entry draft. After two seasons playing for the United States National Team Development Program, Jones joined the Western Hockey League's (WHL) Portland Winterhawks. He has also played in the NHL for the Columbus Blue Jackets and the Chicago Blackhawks.

Jones has represented the United States several times internationally. He won back-to-back gold medals at the 2011 and 2012 IIHF World U18 Championships. He was a member of the 2013 World Junior Ice Hockey Championships team that won a gold medal. Jones won the Stanley Cup with the Panthers in 2025.

== Early life ==
Jones was born in Arlington, Texas, to Amy and Ronald "Popeye" Jones, when his father was a member of the National Basketball Association's (NBA) Dallas Mavericks. He is the middle of the couple's three children, all sons, with Justin being older and Caleb younger. Jones began playing hockey at the age of five when the family was living in Denver, Colorado, while his father was playing for the Nuggets. Justin wanted to play inline hockey with friends. Justin and Seth were given inline skates and in the winter received ice hockey skates. Not knowing much about ice hockey, Popeye asked Hockey Hall of Famer Joe Sakic, then playing in Denver with the Colorado Avalanche, for advice to help his sons become better players after running into him at the Pepsi Center, where both of their respective teams played. Sakic told Popeye to have his sons work on their skating, knowing they would likely have size and natural athleticism. As a result, Seth took skating classes for a year before he began playing organized hockey at age six. He was in attendance for game 7 when the Avalanche won the Stanley Cup in 2001.

== Playing career ==
=== Amateur ===
Jones began playing organized ice hockey with local teams in Denver and playing with travel teams when he was eight years old. He played in the 2005, 2006 and 2007 Quebec International Pee-Wee Hockey Tournaments with three different minor ice hockey teams from Colorado. He and his family moved back to Texas when Jones was 12. At the same time he decided he wanted to play for the United States National Team Development Program (NTDP). He played for the Dallas Stars Bantam Major team, scoring 33 points in 31 games. In the 2009 Bantam draft the Everett Silvertips selected Jones eleventh overall. He was projected to be a higher pick in the draft, but concerns that he would choose to play college hockey over the Western Hockey League (WHL) caused him to be selected lower. After being drafted Jones played another season in Dallas, with the Stars U-18 team before joining the NTDP.

In his first season with the NTDP Jones spent time with both the under 17 and under 18 teams. He served as co-captain of the U-17 team. Jones registered 21 points in 37 games of the NTDP season, which included league play in the United States Hockey League (USHL), plus international play and games against division II and III National Collegiate Athletic Association (NCAA) teams. His 21 points led the team in defense scoring. He continued to serve as co-captain the following season, but slipped to second on the team in defense scoring registering 31 points in 52 total games. After his second season Jones needed to choose whether to play his draft year in the NCAA or with the Silvertips in the WHL. Jones decided that Everett was not a good fit for him and was expected to attend the University of North Dakota. After being informed that Jones would not play for them the Silvertips traded the rights to talk to Jones to the Portland Winterhawks for a conditional bantam draft pick, but retained his rights. Two weeks later, Portland signed Jones and traded two signed players and the rights for two more players to officially complete the trade for acquiring his rights. While playing for Portland, Jones was projected to be a top selection in the 2013 NHL entry draft. At the season's mid-way point the NHL Central Scouting ranked Jones as the number one prospect among North American Skaters and the International Scouting Services listed him first overall.

Jones finished the season with 14 goals and 56 points in 61 games. In the playoffs Portland won the Ed Chynoweth Cup as champions of the WHL. In the Memorial Cup tournament the Winterhawks advanced to the final, where they faced the Halifax Mooseheads. In the final Jones scored a goal in a 6–4 loss, draft rivals Nathan MacKinnon and Jonathan Drouin each recorded 5 points for Halifax. Jones finished the playoffs with 5 goals and 15 points in 21 games. He was named to the First All-Star Team of the Western Conference and won the Jim Piggott Memorial Trophy as WHL rookie of the year.

Heading into the draft Jones was again named the number one overall prospect. Despite the ranking, the Avalanche, who held the top pick, announced that they would not select Jones and used it to draft Halifax Mooseheads forward Nathan MacKinnon. At the draft Jones slid to the fourth overall pick where he was selected by the Nashville Predators. A month later the Predators of the NHL signed Jones to a three-year entry-level contract.

=== Professional ===
==== Nashville Predators (2013–2016) ====
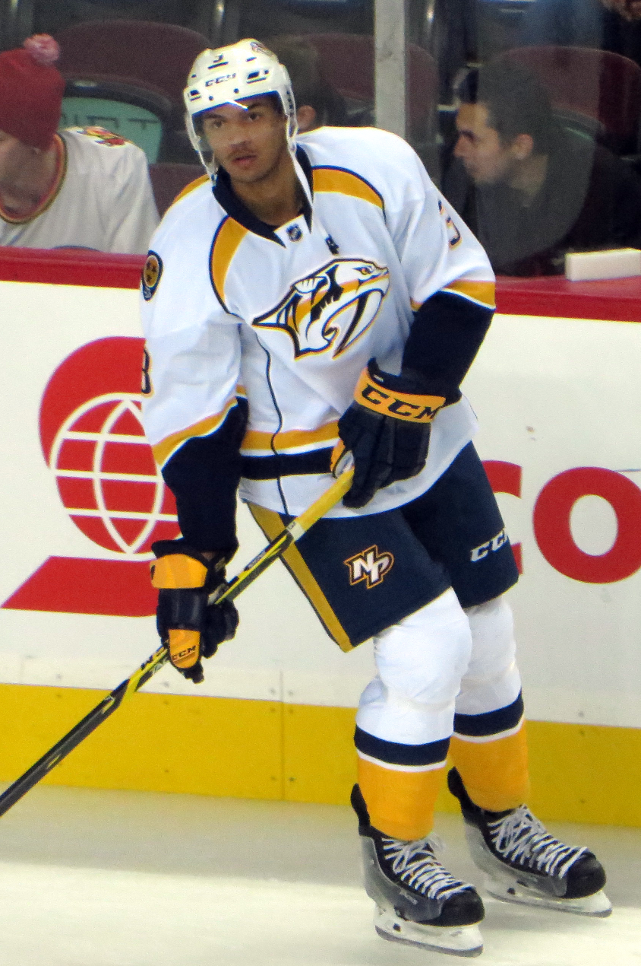
Jones with the Nashville Predators in 2014

Jones made his National Hockey League debut with the Nashville Predators on October 3, 2013, against the St. Louis Blues. Jones scored his first NHL goal on October 12, 2013, against Evgeni Nabokov of the New York Islanders.

==== Columbus Blue Jackets (2016–2021) ====
During the last year of his entry-level contract in the 2015–16 season, on January 6, 2016, Jones was traded by the Predators to the Columbus Blue Jackets in exchange for center Ryan Johansen. At the time of the trade, he had scored 63 points in 199 NHL games.

On June 29, 2016, as an impending restricted free agent, Jones agreed to a long-term extension, signing a six-year, $32.4 million contract to remain with the Blue Jackets.

During the 2016–17 season, Jones was placed on injured reserve due to a hairline fracture in his right foot. Prior to the injury, he led the Blue Jackets in ice time. Jones was activated off injured reserve after missing six games, and ended the season with career highs in assists, goals, and points.

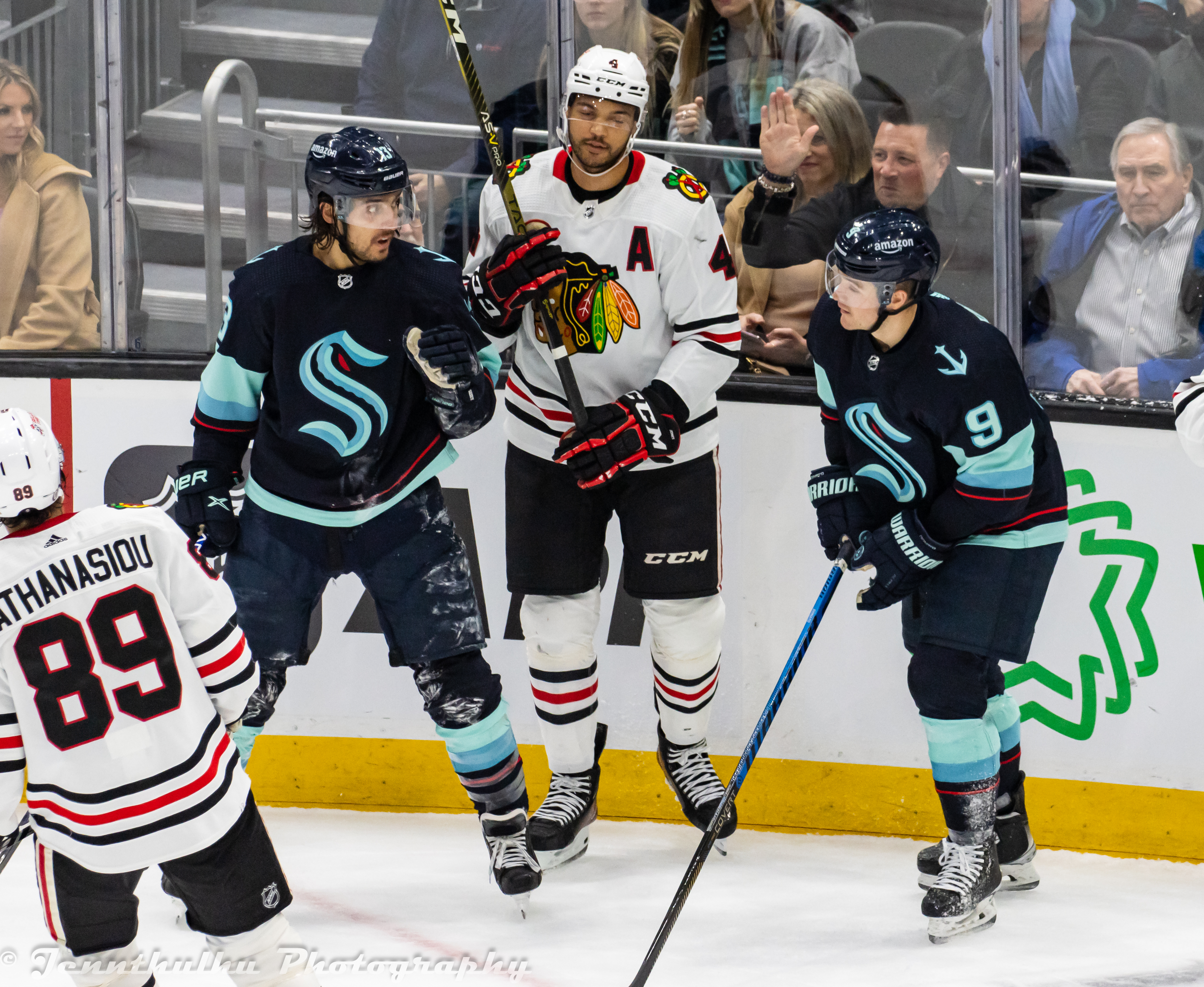
Jones (center) with the Blackhawks in 2024

During the 2017–18 season, Jones developed into one of the Blue Jackets top defenseman, playing an average of 24:36 minutes per game. As a result of his hard work, Jones was selected to represent the Metropolitan Division at the 2018 NHL All-Star Game. However, he could not make it due to illness and fellow Blue Jackets defenseman Zach Werenski replaced him. At the conclusion of the season, Jones tied with Werenski for most goals in franchise history by a defenseman in a season, with 16. Prior to the 2018–19 season, Jones suffered a second-degree MCL sprain during a preseason game against the Buffalo Sabres, causing him to miss the first 7 games.

In February 2020, Jones was placed on long-term injured reserve after undergoing ankle surgery. However, he was able to return when the season resumed for the postseason, being activated off injured reserve on June 18, 2020, and deemed eligible to play in the Stanley Cup playoffs. During game 1 of the team's first-round match-up against the Tampa Bay Lightning, Jones skated an NHL-record 65:06 during a 3–2 quintuple overtime loss.

==== Chicago Blackhawks (2021–2025) ====
On July 23, 2021, Jones, along with 2021 first-round and 2022 sixth-round picks, was traded to the Chicago Blackhawks in exchange for Adam Boqvist, 2021 first-round and second-round picks, and a conditional draft pick.

On July 28, 2021, Jones signed an eight-year, $76 million contract extension with the Blackhawks.

==== Florida Panthers (2025–present) ====
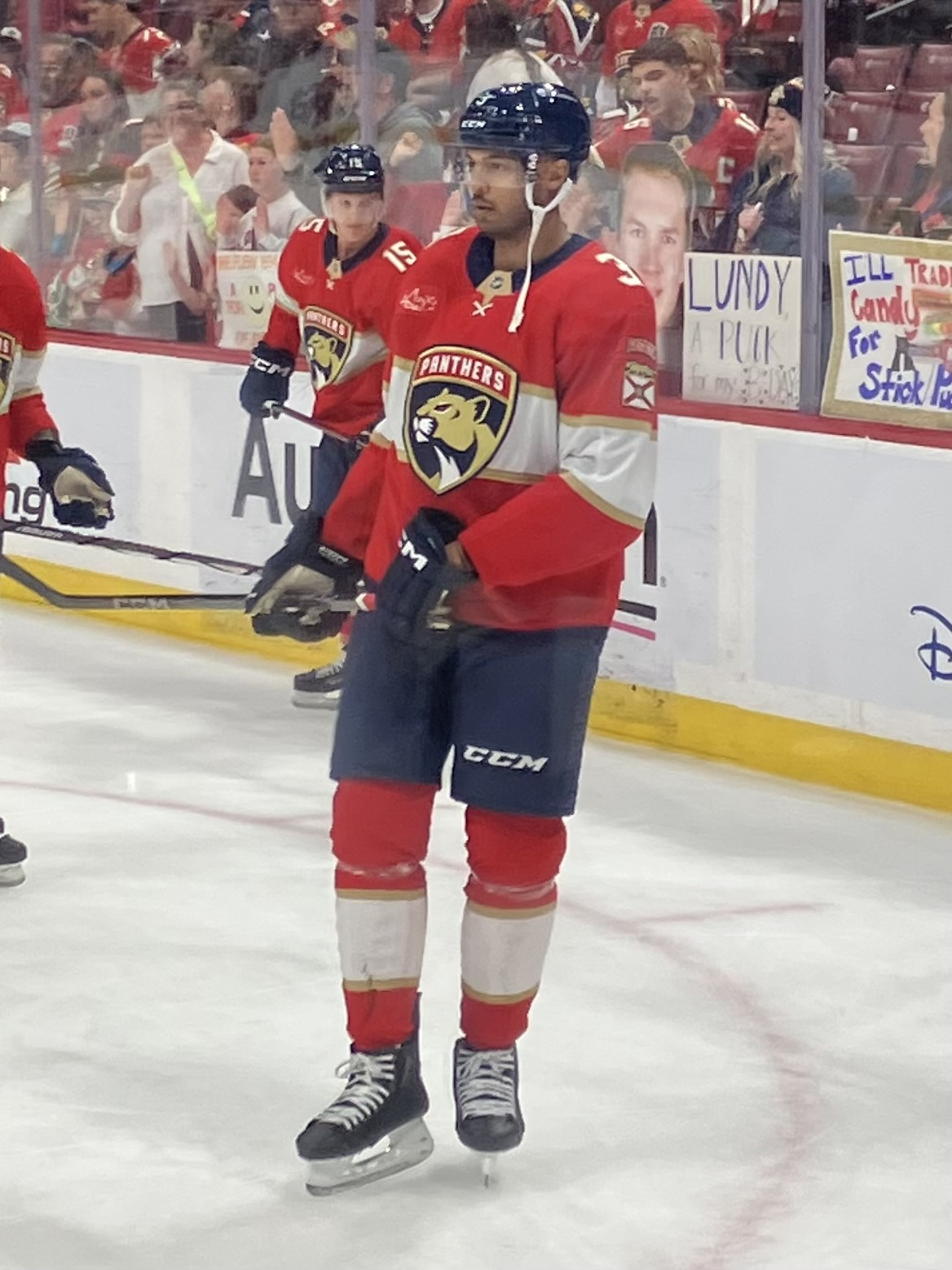
Jones with the Florida Panthers in 2025.

Reports emerged in late February 2025 that Jones had requested a trade from Chicago, owing to frustration over the team's regular-season struggles. Approximately a week later, on March 1, Jones was traded to the Florida Panthers, alongside a fourth-round draft pick, in exchange for Spencer Knight and a conditional first-round pick.

Jones scored the first goal as part of Florida's 6–1 game seven victory over the Toronto Maple Leafs on May 18, 2025. He recorded four goals and five assists for nine points in 23 playoff games. On June 17, Jones became a Stanley Cup champion for the first time when the Panthers defeated the Edmonton Oilers 5–1 in game six of the 2025 Stanley Cup Final.

== International play ==
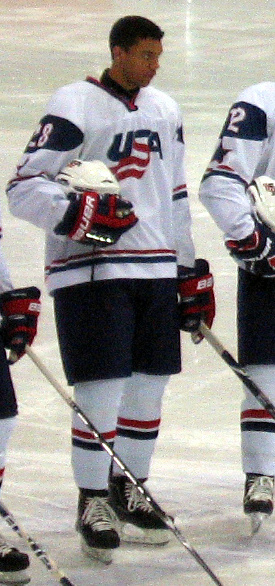
- Jones playing for the United States in the 2011 World U18 Championships

Medal record

Men's ice hockey

Representing the United States

World Championships
Bronze medal – third place	2015 Czech Republic	

World Junior Championships
Gold medal – first place	2013 Russia	

IIHF World U18 Championship
Gold medal – first place	2012 Czech Republic	
Gold medal – first place	2011 Germany	

World Under-17 Hockey Challenge
Silver medal – second place	2011 Manitoba	

Jones first represented the United States at the 2010 Under-17 (U-17) Four Nations Cup. In the tournament Jones scored a goal and registered four points, helping Team USA to a first-place finish. He next represented USA in the 2011 World U-17 Hockey Challenge. Team USA finished the preliminary round undefeated winning all four of their games. In their semi-final game Team USA defeated Canada's Pacific team 6–5 in overtime to advance to the gold medal game. In the Championship game Team USA was defeated 5–3, finishing the tournament as the silver medal winners. In the loss Jones was named the player of the game for the United States. Jones finished the tournament scoring a goal and two points. He was named to the tournament all-star team. Later in the year Jones joined Team USA for the 2011 IIHF World U18 Championships. The United States went undefeated in the preliminary round and the semi-final advancing the gold medal game. In the championship game Team USA faced a two-goal deficit in the third period. The Americans came back eventually tying the game with 1:29 remaining to force overtime. USA scored four minutes into overtime to win the gold medal. Jones finished the tournament with three assists in six games.

As a 17-year-old Jones was selected to play on the United States 2012 World Junior Ice Hockey Championships team, but was unable to play due to an injury. He returned to international competition at the 2012 IIHF World U18 Championships, where he captained Team USA. The American team was again undefeated in the tournament allowing only four total goals in their six games of the completion. It was the United States fourth straight gold medal at the Under 18 tournament. Jones finished with 3 goals and 8 points in the 6 games, he was twice named player of the game for Team USA, and was selected by the coaches as one of the team's top three players.

For the 2013 World Junior Ice Hockey Championships Jones was named one of Team USA's alternate captains. In a pre-tournament interview Jones stated that he felt the Americans were the best team, despite Canada being heavily favored. Team USA started the tournament with a win, but lost consecutive games to Russia and Canada. With a 1–2 record Team USA needed a win against Slovakia to avoid being send to the relegation round. The Americans won the game 9–3 and advanced to the medal round. In the playoff round USA defeated the Czech Republic and the Canadians to earn a spot in the gold medal game. In the championship game Jones had a bouncing puck go through his legs which helped Sweden take a 1–0 lead in the second period. Team USA rallied to win the game 3–1. Offensively Jones registered seven points in seven games and finished seventeenth in tournament scoring. He finished third overall in plus-minus with a +8 rating.

On January 2, 2026, he was named to Team USA's roster for the 2026 Winter Olympics. After sustaining an upper-body injury he was replaced on the roster by Jackson LaCombe.

== Personal life ==
Jones' father is former National Basketball Association (NBA) power forward and current Orlando Magic assistant coach Ronald "Popeye" Jones. He has two brothers. His younger brother, Caleb, plays for the Pittsburgh Penguins of the NHL.

== Career statistics ==
=== Regular season and playoffs ===
			Regular season					Playoffs
Season	Team	League	GP	G	A	Pts	PIM	GP	G	A	Pts	PIM
2010–11	U.S. National Development Team	USHL	57	4	27	31	32	—	—	—	—	—
2011–12	U.S. National Development Team	USHL	52	8	23	31	18	—	—	—	—	—
2012–13	Portland Winterhawks	WHL	61	14	42	56	33	21	5	10	15	4
2013–14	Nashville Predators	NHL	77	6	19	25	24	—	—	—	—	—
2014–15	Nashville Predators	NHL	82	8	19	27	20	6	0	4	4	6
2015–16	Nashville Predators	NHL	40	1	10	11	10	—	—	—	—	—
2015–16	Columbus Blue Jackets	NHL	41	2	18	20	12	—	—	—	—	—
2016–17	Columbus Blue Jackets	NHL	75	12	30	42	24	5	0	2	2	0
2017–18	Columbus Blue Jackets	NHL	78	16	41	57	30	6	1	4	5	4
2018–19	Columbus Blue Jackets	NHL	75	9	37	46	28	10	3	6	9	0
2019–20	Columbus Blue Jackets	NHL	56	6	24	30	20	10	1	3	4	4
2020–21	Columbus Blue Jackets	NHL	56	5	23	28	26	—	—	—	—	—
2021–22	Chicago Blackhawks	NHL	78	5	46	51	28	—	—	—	—	—
2022–23	Chicago Blackhawks	NHL	72	12	25	37	30	—	—	—	—	—
2023–24	Chicago Blackhawks	NHL	67	8	23	31	34	—	—	—	—	—
2024–25	Chicago Blackhawks	NHL	42	7	20	27	18	—	—	—	—	—
2024–25	Florida Panthers	NHL	21	2	7	9	4	23	4	5	9	10
2025–26	Florida Panthers	NHL	52	7	25	32	18	—	—	—	—	—
NHL totals			912	106	367	473	326	60	9	24	33	24

=== International ===
Year	Team	Event	Result	GP	G	A	Pts	PIM
2011	United States	U17	2nd place, silver medalist(s)	5	1	1	2	2
2011	United States	U18	1st place, gold medalist(s)	6	0	3	3	0
2012	United States	U18	1st place, gold medalist(s)	6	3	5	8	0
2013	United States	WJC	1st place, gold medalist(s)	7	1	6	7	4
2014	United States	WC	6th	8	2	9	11	6
2015	United States	WC	3rd place, bronze medalist(s)	10	1	3	4	4
2016	Team North America	WCH	5th	3	0	0	0	2
2022	United States	WC	4th	10	1	4	5	0
2024	United States	WC	5th	8	0	5	5	0
Junior totals				24	5	15	20	6
Senior totals				39	4	21	25	12

== Awards and honors ==
Award	Year	Ref
WHL
WHL Western Conference First All-Star Team	2013	
Jim Piggott Memorial Trophy	2013	
NHL
NHL All-Star Game	2017, 2018, 2019, 2020, 2023	
NHL Second All-Star Team	2018	
Stanley Cup champion	2025	
IIHF
World U-17 Hockey Challenge All-Star Team	2011	
IIHF World U18 Championships Team USA Best Player (one of three)	2012	
World Championship All-Star Team	2014, 2022	
World Championship Best Defenseman	2014	

== NHL records ==
- Most time on ice by a defenseman in one playoff game: 65:06 (August 11, 2020)

Awards and achievements
Preceded by Austin Watson	Nashville Predators first-round draft pick 2013	Succeeded by Kevin Fiala
