= Andrey Makarov (ice hockey) =

Russian ice hockey player (born 1993)

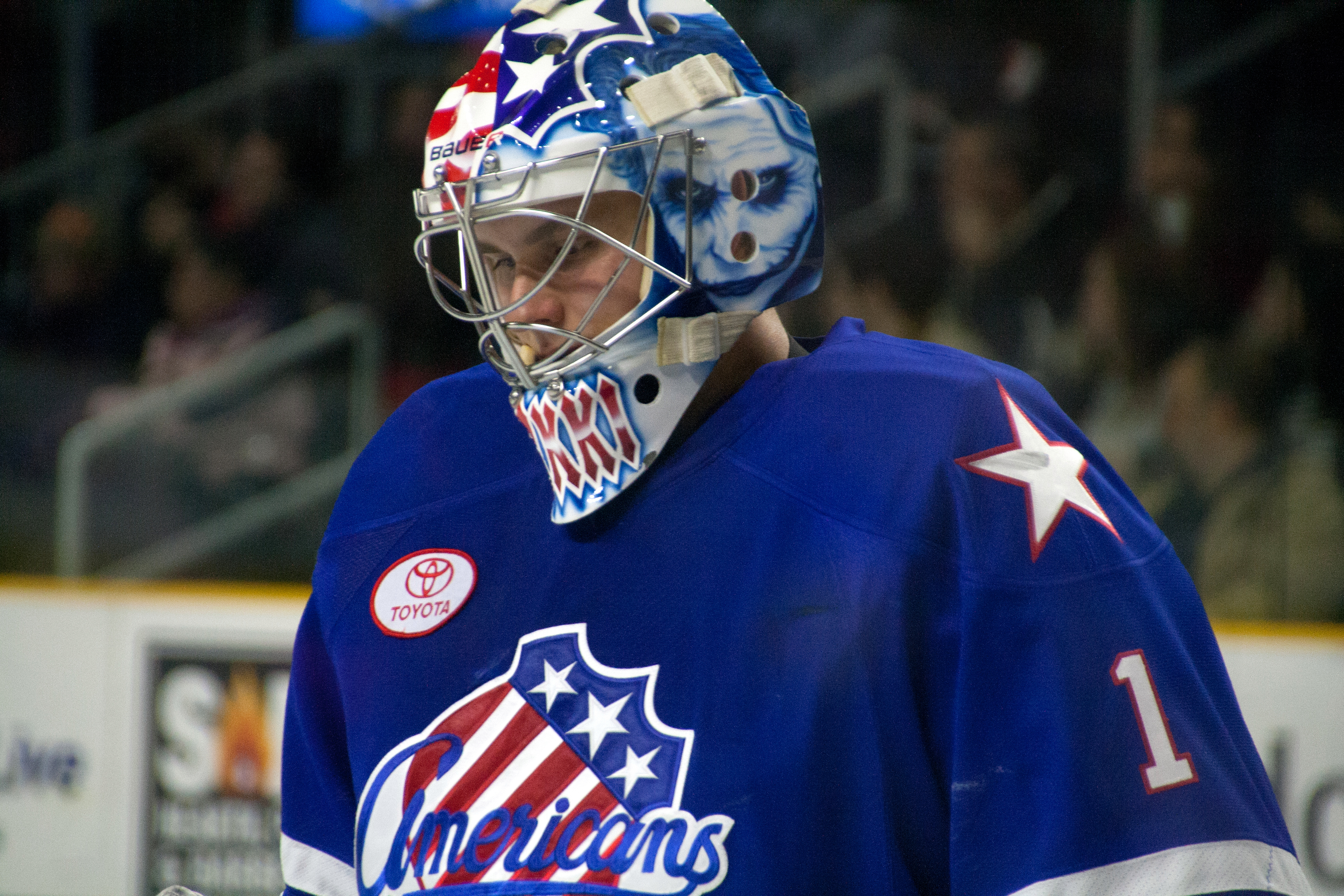
- Makarov with the Rochester Americans in 2016
- Born: 20 April 1993 (age 33) Kazan, Russia
- Height: 6 ft 0 in (183 cm)
- Weight: 165 lb (75 kg; 11 st 11 lb)
- Position: Goaltender
- Catches: Left
- Belarusian Extraleague team Former teams: HC Dinamo-Molodechno; Buffalo Sabres; Kunlun Red Star; Neftekhimik Nizhnekamsk; Avtomobilist Yekaterinburg; Dinamo Riga; HC Slovan Bratislava
- NHL draft: Undrafted
- Playing career: 2013–present

Andrey Makarov (born 20 April 1993) is a Russian professional ice hockey goaltender currently playing for HC Dinamo-Molodechno of the Belarusian Extraleague. He played one game in the National Hockey League (NHL) for the Buffalo Sabres.

== Playing career ==
Makarov played major junior hockey with both the Lewiston Maineiacs of the QMJHL and the Saskatoon Blades of the WHL. He also played with the Russia men's national junior ice hockey team at both the 2012 and 2013 World Junior Ice Hockey Championships, winning silver and bronze respectively. On 14 September 2012, the Buffalo Sabres of the National Hockey League (NHL) signed Makarov as an undrafted free agent to a three-year entry-level contract, but assigned him to continue his play in the WHL with the Saskatoon Blades. Playing with the Blades during the 2012–13 season, Makarov was awarded the Hap Emms Memorial Trophy as the most outstanding goaltender at the 2013 Memorial Cup. In 115 career WHL games with Saskatoon, Makarov went 66-38-7 with a .916 save percentage, a 2.80 goals against average (GAA), and nine shutouts.

Makarov made his professional debut on 1 November 2013 with the Fort Wayne Komets of the ECHL where he played 31 games during the 2013–14 season to post a record of 15-11-4 with a .906 save percentage and a 2.79 GAA. He was recalled to the Rochester Americans of the American Hockey League (AHL) on 17 March 2014, where he played 6 games before receiving his first NHL call-up, on 8 April 2014, to join the roster of the Buffalo Sabres.

Makarov opted to leave for the Kontinental Hockey League (KHL) for the 2016–17 season. Among the factors for his decision to leave the Sabres organization was that he believed Tim Murray, the Sabres' general manager, held a bias against Russian players; Makarov noted that, at the time of his departure, he was the only Russian in the Sabres' entire farm system, after Murray had traded away fellow Russians Mikhail Grigorenko and Nikita Zadorov. Makarov signed a two-year deal with HC Spartak Moscow.

Before appearing in a game with CSKA, Makarov was acquired by Chinese entrant, HC Kunlun Red Star on 5 July 2017. He appeared in their inaugural season, posting a .912 save percentage in 29 games in the 2016–17 regular season. On 10 May 2017, Makarov was returned to CSKA before he was swiftly traded to HC Neftekhimik Nizhnekamsk in exchange for financial compensation.

In his second season with Nizhnekamsk in 2018–19, earning just one win in six games, Makarov left the club to sign with Avtomobilist Yekaterinburg on 23 November 2018.

== Career statistics ==
=== Regular season and playoffs ===
			Regular season									Playoffs							
Season	Team	League	GP	W	L	OTL	MP	GA	SO	GAA	SV%	GP	W	L	MP	GA	SO	GAA	SV%
2009–10	Lada Togliatti	MHL	22	—	—	—	1114	—	—	4.04	.874	—	—	—	—	—	—	—	—
2010–11	Lewiston MAINEiacs	QMJHL	27	11	12	2	1390	78	2	3.37	.890	3	0	1	106	6	0	3.40	.895
2011–12	Saskatoon Blades	WHL	54	29	21	2	3107	156	2	3.01	.913	4	0	4	249	17	0	4.10	.872
2012–13	Saskatoon Blades	WHL	61	37	17	5	3487	152	7	2.62	.919	4	0	4	196	12	0	3.66	.897
2013–14	Fort Wayne Komets	ECHL	31	15	11	4	1850	86	0	2.79	.906	—	—	—	—	—	—	—	—
2013–14	Rochester Americans	AHL	10	7	3	0	601	22	0	2.20	.927	5	2	3	299	15	0	3.01	.907
2014–15	Rochester Americans	AHL	39	16	18	3	2209	107	3	2.91	.905	—	—	—	—	—	—	—	—
2014–15	Buffalo Sabres	NHL	1	0	1	0	60	3	0	3.00	.917	—	—	—	—	—	—	—	—
2015–16	Rochester Americans	AHL	22	9	9	2	1211	57	1	2.82	.916	—	—	—	—	—	—	—	—
2016–17	Kunlun Red Star	KHL	29	12	15	0	1654	71	2	2.58	.912	2	0	1	95	5	0	3.14	.889
2017–18	Neftekhimik Nizhnekamsk	KHL	12	6	4	0	596	21	1	2.11	.922	3	1	0	126	5	0	2.38	.922
2018–19	Neftekhimik Nizhnekamsk	KHL	6	1	3	1	318	14	0	2.64	.897	—	—	—	—	—	—	—	—
2018–19	CSK VVS Samara	VHL	7	3	2	2	430	14	0	1.95	.913	—	—	—	—	—	—	—	—
2018–19	Avtomobilist Yekaterinburg	KHL	3	0	1	0	92	6	0	3.92	.875	—	—	—	—	—	—	—	—
2019–20	Buran Voronezh	VHL	5	1	2	2	239	10	0	2.51	.917	—	—	—	—	—	—	—	—
2019–20	Dinamo Riga	KHL	19	4	11	0	866	45	0	3.12	.906	—	—	—	—	—	—	—	—
2020–21	HC Slovan Bratislava	TL	11	—	—	—	562	20	2	2.14	.907	—	—	—	—	—	—	—	—
2021–22	HC Donbass	UHL	8	6	1	0	526	14	2	1.60	.938	—	—	—	—	—	—	—	—
2021–22	HC Donbass	USHL	10	—	—	—	—	—	—	1.23	.950	—	—	—	—	—	—	—	—
2022-23	Buran Voronezh	VHL	27	3	19	0	1369	69	1	3.03	.895	—	—	—	—	—	—	—	—
NHL totals			1	0	1	0	60	3	0	3.00	.917	—	—	—	—	—	—	—	—
KHL totals			69	23	34	1	3526	157	3	2.67	.910	5	1	1	221	10	0	2.71	.908

== Awards and honours ==
Award	Year
CHL
Hap Emms Memorial Trophy – Memorial Cup Top Goaltender	2013
International
IIHF World U20 Championship Silver (Team Russia)	2012
IIHF World U20 Championship Bronze (Team Russia)	2013
