= 2013 Memorial Cup =

Canadian junior men's ice hockey championship

2013 Mastercard Memorial Cup

Tournament details
- Venue(s): Credit Union Centre; Saskatoon, Saskatchewan
- Dates: May 17–26, 2013
- Teams: 4
- Host team: Saskatoon Blades (WHL)
- TV partner(s): Sportsnet, TVA Sports

Final positions
- Champions: Halifax Mooseheads (QMJHL) (1st title)
- Runners-up: Portland Winterhawks (WHL)

Tournament statistics
- Attendance: 82,503
- Scoring leader: Nathan MacKinnon (Mooseheads) (13 points)

Awards
- MVP: Nathan MacKinnon (Mooseheads)

The Memorial Cup trophy

The 2013 Memorial Cup was a four-team, round-robin format ice hockey tournament played from May 17–26, 2013. It was the 95th Memorial Cup championship and determined the champion of the Canadian Hockey League (CHL). The tournament featured the London Knights, champions of the Ontario Hockey League, the Halifax Mooseheads, champions of the Quebec Major Junior Hockey League, the Portland Winterhawks, champions of the Western Hockey League, and the Saskatoon Blades, who won the right to host the tournament over bids by the Kelowna Rockets and the Red Deer Rebels. This was the first Memorial Cup to be held in Saskatoon since the Blades hosted it in 1989. The Halifax Mooseheads won the Memorial Cup for the first time in franchise history, beating the Portland Winterhawks 6–4 in the final. The Halifax Mooseheads joined the Saint John Sea Dogs in 2011, and the Shawinigan Cataractes in 2012, as the third straight team from the QMJHL to capture the trophy.

== Round-robin standings ==
Pos	Team	Pld	W	L	GF	GA	
1	Halifax Mooseheads (QMJHL)	3	2	1	18	11	Advanced directly to the championship game
2	Portland Winterhawks (WHL)	3	2	1	14	12	Advanced to the semifinal game
3	London Knights (OHL)	3	1	2	8	17	Won the tie-breaker to advance to the semi-finals
4	Saskatoon Blades (WHL/Host)	3	1	2	9	9	

For the second time since the current tournament format was established in 1983, the teams each split their first two games. At the conclusion of the round-robin, the tiebreaker between the first and second team as well as between the third and fourth placed team were decided by head-to-head records.

== Schedule ==
All times local (UTC −6)

=== Round robin ===
May 17	London Knights	3 – 2	Saskatoon Blades	Credit Union Centre, Saskatoon	Recap
Brett Welychka (1) - 12:55; Seth Griffith (1) - 18:21		First period	7:59 - Josh Nicholls (1)
No scoring		Second period	15:21 - Josh Nicholls (2)
Nikita Zadorov (1) - pp - 5:45		Third period	No scoring
Anthony Stolarz (27 saves / 29 shots)		Goalie stats	Andrey Makarov (30 saves / 33 shots)

May 18	Portland Winterhawks	4 – 7	Halifax Mooseheads	Credit Union Centre, Saskatoon	Recap
Seth Jones (1) - 16:41		First period	15:46 - Martin Frk (1)
Troy Rutkowski (1) - 0:39; Ty Rattie (1) - pp - 2:11		Second period	3:16 - Jonathan Drouin 1; 4:36 - Nathan MacKinnon (1); 11:17 - pp - Luca Ciampini (1); 14:03 - pp - Nathan MacKinnon (2); 18:35 - sh - Nathan MacKinnon (3)
Troy Rutkowski (2) - pp - 1:09		Third period	5:33 - Stephen MacAulay (1)
Mac Carruth (28 saves / 35 shots)		Goalie stats	Zachary Fucale (37 saves / 41 shots)

May 19	Saskatoon Blades	5 – 2	Halifax Mooseheads	Credit Union Centre, Saskatoon	Recap
Matěj Stránský (1) - 12:11		First period	No scoring
Matěj Stránský (2) - 18:45		Second period	No scoring
Collin Valcourt (1) - 1:43; Darren Dietz (1) - pp - 2:40; Josh Nicholls (3) - en - 19:58		Third period	6:48 - Stephen MacAulay (2); 8:19 - Nathan MacKinnon (4)
Andrey Makarov (29 saves / 31 shots)		Goalie stats	Zachary Fucale (26 saves / 30 shots)

May 20	Portland Winterhawks	6 – 3	London Knights	Credit Union Centre, Saskatoon	Recap
Taylor Leier (1) - 16:53		First period	No scoring
Oliver Bjorkstrand (1) - 2:17; Ty Rattie (2) - 10:23		Second period	10:38 - Scott Harrington (1); 12:30 - pp - Bo Horvat (1)
Derrick Pouliot (1) - pp - 6:20; Chase De Leo (1) - 6:43; Ty Rattie (3) - 19:05		Third period	1:48 - Alex Broadhurst (1)
Mac Carruth (25 saves / 28 shots)		Goalie stats	Anthony Stolarz (26 saves / 31 shots); Jake Patterson (4 saves / 5 shots)

May 21	Halifax Mooseheads	9 – 2	London Knights	Credit Union Centre, Saskatoon	Recap
Stefan Fournier (1) - pp - 7:43; Darcy Ashley (1) - 9:36; Darcy Ashley (2) - 12:02; Brent Andrews (1) - 17:31; Martin Frk (2) - 18:00		First period	No scoring
Martin Frk (3) - 1:45; Ryan Falkenham (1) - 9:51; Martin Frk (4) - 18:03		Second period	16:02 - Seth Griffith (2); 17:20 - Matt Rupert (1)
Luca Ciampini (2) - pp - 19:03		Third period	No scoring
Zachary Fucale (26 saves / 28 shots)		Goalie stats	Jake Patterson (6 saves / 11 shots); Anthony Stolarz (22 saves / 26 shots)

May 22	Saskatoon Blades	2 – 4	Portland Winterhawks	Credit Union Centre, Saskatoon	Recap
No scoring		First period	No scoring
Shane McColgan (1) - pp - 11:20		Second period	6:44 - Derrick Pouliot (2)
Josh Nicholls (4) - 16:27		Third period	4:08 - Chase De Leo (2); 6:27 - Brendan Leipsic (1); 10:16 - Ty Rattie (4)
Andrey Makarov (30 saves / 34 shots)		Goalie stats	Mac Carruth (29 saves / 31 shots)

=== Playoff round ===
==== Tie-Breaker ====
May 23	Saskatoon Blades	1 – 6	London Knights	Credit Union Centre, Saskatoon	Recap
No scoring		First period	3:05 - sh - ps - Bo Horvat (2)
No scoring		Second period	11:28 - pp - Seth Griffith (3); 12:17 - Chris Tierney (1)
Nathan Burns 1 - 11:40		Third period	2:16 - Ryan Rupert (1); 2:53 - Kyle Platzer (1); 3:22 - Nikita Zadorov (2)
Andrey Makarov (31 saves / 37 shots); Alex Moodie (3 saves / 3 shots)		Goalie stats	Jake Patterson (32 saves / 33 shots)

==== Semi-final ====
May 24	London Knights	1 – 2	Portland Winterhawks	Credit Union Centre, Saskatoon	Recap
No scoring		First period	No scoring
Max Domi (1) - pp - 12:43		Second period	14:51 - Tyler Wotherspoon (1)
No scoring		Third period	8:32 - Ty Rattie (5)
Jake Patterson (32 saves / 34 shots)		Goalie stats	Mac Carruth (34 saves / 35 shots)

==== Final ====
May 26	Portland Winterhawks	4 – 6	Halifax Mooseheads	Credit Union Centre, Saskatoon	Recap
No scoring		First period	6:31 - pp - Konrad Abeltshauser (1); 8:00 - Nathan MacKinnon (5); 15:59 - Martin Frk (5)
Nic Petan (1) - sh - 10:36; Seth Jones (2) - 18:41		Second period	No scoring
Brendan Leipsic (2) - 14:32; Ty Rattie (6) - 18:44		Third period	7:36 - Nathan MacKinnon (6); 11:11 - Konrad Abeltshauser (2); 19:37 - en - Nathan MacKinnon (7)
Mac Carruth (36 saves / 41 shots)		Goalie stats	Zach Fucale (40 saves / 44 shots)

== Statistical leaders ==
=== Skaters ===
Player	Team	GP	G	A	Pts	PIM
Nathan MacKinnon	Halifax Mooseheads	4	7	6	13	0
Ty Rattie	Portland Winterhawks	5	6	6	12	6
Nic Petan	Portland Winterhawks	5	1	9	10	0
Martin Frk	Halifax Mooseheads	4	5	4	9	8
Jonathan Drouin	Halifax Mooseheads	4	1	8	9	0
Derrick Pouliot	Portland Winterhawks	5	2	5	7	10
Josh Nicholls	Saskatoon Blades	4	4	2	6	4
Seth Griffith	London Knights	5	3	3	6	10
Darcy Ashley	Halifax Mooseheads	4	2	3	5	2
Stephen MacAulay	Halifax Mooseheads	4	2	3	5	2
Bo Horvat	London Knights	5	2	3	5	0

GP = Games played; G = Goals; A = Assists; Pts = Points; PIM = Penalty minutes

=== Goaltending ===
This is a combined table of the top goaltenders based on goals against average and save percentage with at least sixty minutes played. The table is sorted by GAA.

Player	Team	GP	W	L	SA	GA	GAA	SV%	SO	TOI
Jake Patterson	London Knights	4	1	2	82	8	3.18	.902	0	151:00
Zachary Fucale	Halifax Mooseheads	4	3	1	129	14	3.52	.902	0	239:00
Mac Carruth	Portland Winterhawks	5	3	2	170	18	3.61	.894	0	299:00
Andrey Makarov	Saskatoon Blades	4	1	3	135	15	4.09	.889	0	220:00
Anthony Stolarz	London Knights	3	1	1	86	11	4.50	.872	0	147:00

GP = Games played; W = Wins; L = Losses; SA = Shots against; GA = Goals against; GAA = Goals against average; SV% = Save percentage; SO = Shutouts; TOI = Time on ice (minutes:seconds)

== Awards ==
- Stafford Smythe Memorial Trophy (MVP): Nathan MacKinnon (Halifax Mooseheads)
- Ed Chynoweth Trophy (Leading Scorer): Nathan MacKinnon (Halifax Mooseheads)
- George Parsons Trophy (Sportsmanlike): Bo Horvat (London Knights)
- Hap Emms Memorial Trophy (Top Goalie): Andrey Makarov (Saskatoon Blades)
- All-Star Team:

Goaltender: Zach Fucale (Halifax Mooseheads)
Defence: Konrad Abeltshauser (Halifax Mooseheads), Derrick Pouliot (Portland Winterhawks)
Forwards: Martin Frk (Halifax Mooseheads), Nathan MacKinnon (Halifax Mooseheads), Ty Rattie (Portland Winterhawks)

== Team rosters ==
=== Saskatoon Blades (Host) ===
- Head coach: Lorne Molleken

Pos.	No.	Player
GK	1	Andrey Makarov
GK	33	Alex Moodie
D	2	Matthew Pufahl
D	5	Duncan Siemens
D	6	Graeme Craig
D	8	Shayne Gwinner
D	44	Darren Dietz
D	47	Dalton Thrower
D	55	Nelson Nogier
F	9	Shane McColgan
F	11	Erik Benoit
F	14	Matej Stransky
F	16	Matt Revel
F	17	Nick Zajac
F	18	Logan Harland
F	19	Brenden Walker
F	20	Josh Nicholls
F	21	Nathan Burns
F	23	Lukas Sutter
F	24	Collin Valcourt
F	27	Micheal Ferland
F	38	Brett Stovin
F	39	Ryan Graham
F	41	Jessey Astles

=== Portland Winterhawks (WHL) ===
- Head coach: Travis Green

Pos.	No.	Player
GK	1	Brendan Burke
GK	31	Mac Carruth
D	2	Troy Rutkowski
D	3	Seth Jones
D	4	Josh Hanson
D	6	Shaun MacPherson
D	26	Tyler Wotherspoon
D	29	Kirill Vorobev
D	42	Layne Viveiros
D	44	Keoni Texeira
D	51	Derrick Pouliot
F	9	Paul Bittner
F	8	Ty Rattie
F	9	Chase De Leo
F	11	Adam De Champlain
F	12	Presten Kopeck
F	13	Keegan Iverson
F	16	Joey Baker
F	19	Nic Petan
F	20	Taylor Leier
F	23	Alex Schoenborn
F	23	Dominic Turgeon
F	24	Joe Mahon
F	25	Taylor Peters
F	27	Oliver Bjorkstrand
F	28	Brendan Leipsic

=== London Knights (OHL) ===
- Head coach: Dale Hunter

Pos.	No.	Player
GK	35	Jake Patterson
GK	43	Anthony Stolarz
D	2	Olli Maatta
D	3	Justin Sefton
D	4	Miles Liberati
D	6	Scott Harrington
D	14	Tommy Hughes
D	44	Dakota Mermis
D	65	Nikita Zadorov
F	7	Corey Pawley
F	16	Max Domi
F	17	Seth Griffith
F	18	Alex Broadhurst
F	21	Tyler Ferry
F	27	Brett Welychka
F	46	Matt Rupert
F	51	Paxton Leroux
F	53	Bo Horvat
F	64	Ryan Rupert
F	71	Chris Tierney
F	77	Josh Anderson
F	81	Remi Elie
F	91	Kyle Platzer
F	95	Jacob Jammes

=== Halifax Mooseheads (QMJHL) ===
- Head coach: Dominique Ducharme

Pos.	No.	Player
GK	1	Chris Clarke
GK	31	Zachary Fucale
D	6	Brennan Bailey
D	7	Trey Lewis
D	8	Brendan Duke
D	10	Konrad Abeltshauser
D	24	Matt Murphy
D	52	Mackenzie Weegar
D	88	Austyn Hardie
F	5	Brian Lovell
F	9	Andrew Ryan
F	17	Darcy Ashley
F	19	Ryan Falkenham
F	20	Liam Alcalde
F	21	Dominic Beauchemin
F	22	Nathan MacKinnon
F	27	Jonathan Drouin
F	28	Max Lindsay
F	48	Luca Ciampini
F	57	Matthew Boudreau
F	74	Stefan Fournier
F	79	Brent Andrews
F	81	Stephen MacAulay
F	91	Martin Frk

== Road to the Cup ==
=== WHL Playoffs ===
Conference Quarterfinals	Conference Semifinals
1	Edmonton Oil Kings	4
8	Kootenay Ice	1
1	Edmonton	4
7	Medicine Hat	0
2	Saskatoon Blades	0
7	Medicine Hat Tigers	4
Eastern
3	Calgary Hitmen	4
6	Swift Current Broncos	1
3	Calgary	4
4	Red Deer	1
4	Red Deer Rebels	4
5	Prince Albert Raiders	0
Note: Pairings are re-seeded after the first round.
1	Portland Winterhawks	4
8	Everett Silvertips	2
1	Portland	4
4	Spokane	0
2	Kelowna Rockets	4
7	Seattle Thunderbirds	3
Western
3	Kamloops Blazers	4
6	Victoria Royals	2
2	Kelowna	0
3	Kamloops	4
4	Spokane Chiefs	4
5	Tri-City Americans	1

Conference Finals
1	Edmonton	4
3	Calgary	3
1	Portland	4
3	Kamloops	1

WHL Championship
E1	Edmonton	2
W1	Portland	4

=== OHL Playoffs ===
Conference Quarter-finals	Conference Semi-finals
1	Belleville Bulls	4
8	Mississauga Steelheads	2
1	Belleville	4
5	Sudbury	0
2	Barrie Colts	4
7	Kingston Frontenacs	0
Eastern Conference
3	Oshawa Generals	4
6	Niagara IceDogs	1
2	Barrie	4
3	Oshawa	0
4	Brampton Battalion	1
5	Sudbury Wolves	4
Note: Pairings are re-seeded after the first round.
1	London Knights	4
8	Saginaw Spirit	0
1	London	4
4	Kitchener	1
2	Plymouth Whalers	4
7	Sarnia Sting	0
Western Conference
3	Owen Sound Attack	4
6	Sault Ste. Marie Greyhounds	2
2	Plymouth	4
3	Owen Sound	2
4	Kitchener Rangers	4
5	Guelph Storm	1

Conference Finals
1	Belleville	3
2	Barrie	4
1	London	4
2	Plymouth	1

OHL Championship
E2	Barrie	3
W1	London	4

=== QMJHL Playoffs ===
Round 1
1	Halifax Mooseheads	4
16	Saint John Sea Dogs	0
4	Rimouski Océanic	2
13	Gatineau Olympiques	4
5	Quebec Remparts	4
12	Chicoutimi Saguenéens	2
8	Rouyn-Noranda Huskies	4
9	Drummondville Voltigeurs	1
2	Baie-Comeau Drakkar	4
15	Sherbrooke Phoenix	0
6	Moncton Wildcats	1
11	Victoriaville Tigres	4
3	Blainville-Boisbriand Armada	4
14	Acadie–Bathurst Titan	1
7	P.E.I. Rocket	2
10	Val-d'Or Foreurs	4

Quarter-finals
1	Halifax	4
13	Gatineau	0
5	Quebec	1
8	Rouyn-Noranda	4
2	Baie-Comeau	4
11	Victoriaville	0
3	Blainville-Boisbriand	4
10	Val-d'Or	0

Semi-finals
1	Halifax	4
8	Rouyn-Noranda	0
2	Baie-Comeau	4
3	Blainville-Boisbriand	2

President's Cup Championship
1	Halifax	4
2	Baie-Comeau	1
