= Tyler Wotherspoon =

Canadian ice hockey player (born 1993)

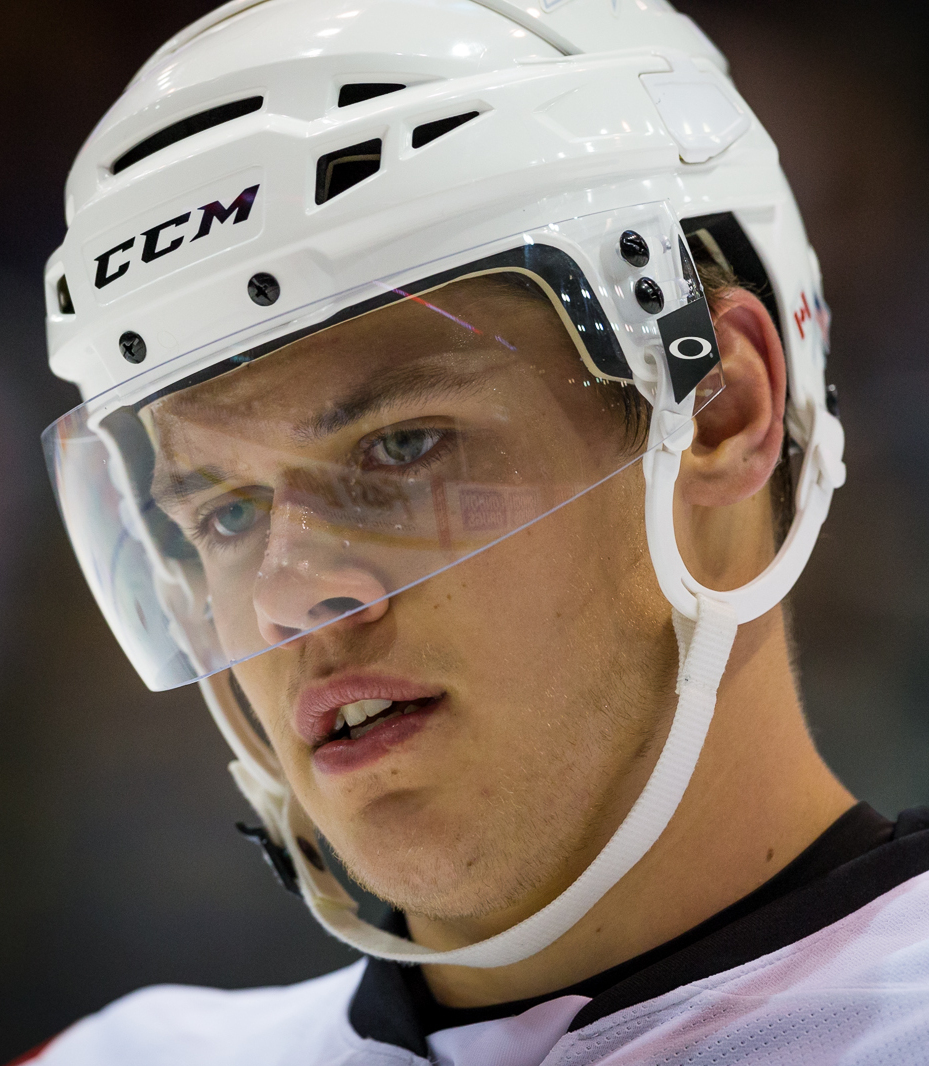
- Wotherspoon with the Abbotsford Heat in 2013
- Born: March 12, 1993 (age 33) Burnaby, British Columbia, Canada
- Height: 6 ft 2 in (188 cm)
- Weight: 222 lb (101 kg; 15 st 12 lb)
- Position: Defence
- Shoots: Left
- team Former teams: Free agent Calgary Flames; Barys Astana
- National team: Canada
- NHL draft: 57th overall, 2011; Calgary Flames
- Playing career: 2013–present

Tyler Wotherspoon (born March 12, 1993) is a Canadian professional ice hockey defenceman who is currently an unrestricted free agent. He last played for Barys Astana of the Kontinental Hockey League (KHL). He was selected in the second round, 57th overall, by the Calgary Flames in the 2011 NHL entry draft.

== Playing career ==
=== Junior ===
A native of Burnaby, British Columbia, Wotherspoon was selected by the Portland Winter Hawks in the second round of the 2008 Western Hockey League (WHL) bantam draft. He made his WHL debut as a 15-year-old in 2008–09, appearing in four games for Portland, then played four full seasons between 2009 and 2013. During his WHL career, he appeared in 239 total games, scoring 17 goals, and registering 65 assists. With the Winterhawks, Wotherspoon appeared in the WHL championship series in three consecutive years as Portland lost the final in 2011 and 2012 to the Kootenay Ice and Edmonton Oil Kings, respectively, before finally winning the Ed Chynoweth Cup championship in 2013 by defeating Edmonton. Wotherspoon was also named to the WHL's Western Conference second All-Star Team in 2012–13. Wotherspoon scored three points in five games at the 2013 Memorial Cup, however Portland lost the Canadian Hockey League (CHL) championship game, the Memorial Cup, to the Halifax Mooseheads, 6–4. During the season, Wotherspoon was also a member of the Canadian junior team, recording two points in six games at the 2013 World Junior Ice Hockey Championships.

=== Professional ===
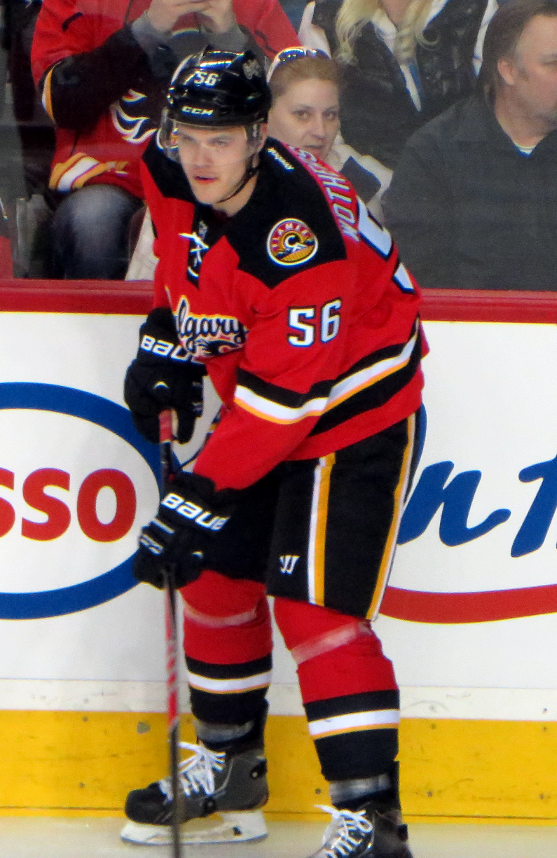
Wotherspoon playing for the Calgary Flames in 2014

Selected by the Calgary Flames with their second-round pick (57th overall) during the 2011 National Hockey League (NHL) entry draft, Flames Special Assistant to General Manager Craig Conroy described Wotherspoon as a player whose qualities often go unnoticed: "If you're a stay-at-home defenceman that can join the rush, make the good first pass, doesn't get beat one-on-one, very sound, it doesn’t stand out." Upon turning professional, Wotherspoon was assigned to Calgary's American Hockey League (AHL) affiliate, the Abbotsford Heat, for the 2013–14 season. He had nine points in his first 48 games and a plus-minus of +13 when an injury to defenceman Dennis Wideman late in the season caused the Flames to recall Wotherspoon on an emergency basis. He made his NHL debut on March 7, 2014, a 4–3 victory over the New York Islanders. He recorded his first point the following night with an assist on a Brian McGrattan goal in a contest against the Vancouver Canucks. Wotherspoon appeared in 14 games with the Flames, recording four assists, before suffering a shoulder injury that required surgery and ended his season. In the 2014–15 season, Wotherspoon was assigned to the Flames new AHL affiliate, the Adirondack Flames. Having played 61 games with Adirondack, scoring 2 goals and 24 points, he was recalled by Calgary on April 3, 2015. He made his NHL season debut in the season finale, a 5–1 loss to the Winnipeg Jets. He made his playoff debut in the 2015 Stanley Cup playoffs, making four appearances in the first round win over the Vancouver Canucks, paired with David Schlemko. He made two more appearances in the second round where the Flames were defeated by the Anaheim Ducks.

Wotherspoon was assigned to the Flames' new AHL affiliate, the Stockton Heat, to start the 2015–16 season. He was recalled by Calgary in February 2016 and made his NHL season debut against the Vancouver Canucks. He appeared in 53 games with Stockton, scoring 2 goals and 10 points. In 11 games with Calgary, he registered just one assist. In the 2016–17 season, Wotherspoon spent the majority of the season with Stockton, playing in 56 games, netting six goals and 18 points. In the 2017 Calder Cup playoffs, Wotherspoon appeared in five games for Stockon, going scoreless. He also played in four games with Calgary going scoreless. On September 5, 2017, the Flames re-signed Wotherspoon to a one-year, two-way contract worth $650,000. He was assigned to Stockton for the 2017–18 season after going unclaimed on waivers where he put up career highs in goals (7), assists (30) and points (37) in 67 games. He was named one of Stockton's associate captains for the season.

After five seasons within the Flames organization, Wotherspoon left as a free agent to sign a one-year, two-way contract with the St. Louis Blues on July 1, 2018. He was assigned to the Blues' AHL affiliate, the San Antonio Rampage, for the 2018–19 season. He played in 70 games with San Antonio, scoring 4 goals and 22 points.

On July 1, 2019, Wotherspoon signed a two-year, two-way contract with the Philadelphia Flyers. He was assigned to the Flyers' AHL affiliate, the Lehigh Valley Phantoms, after going unclaimed on waivers to start the 2019–20 season. He played in 54 games, scoring 4 goals and 22 points before the AHL suspended play on March 12, 2020 due to the COVID-19 pandemic. He spent the pandemic-shortened 2020–21 season with Lehigh Valley, playing in 24 games and registering six points, all assists.

On September 14, 2021, Wotherspoon signed a professional tryout contract (PTO) with the New Jersey Devils. After participating in training camp and preseason, he was released from the PTO contract and signed a one-year deal with the Devils' AHL affiliate, the Utica Comets, on October 13, 2021. Following a successful season with the Comets in which he scored three goals and 21 points in 53 games, Wotherspoon was signed to a two-year, two-way contract by the Devils to continue within their organization on July 13, 2022. He would be assigned to Utica for the 2022–23 season and was named one of team's alternate captains. Wotherspoon was again assigned to Utica for the 2023–24 season, recording four goals and 18 assists in 65 games.

On July 1, 2024, Wotherspoon signed a one-year AHL contract with the Montreal Canadiens' affiliate Laval Rocket. He was subsequently named one of Laval's alternate captains for the 2024–25 season.

On September 26, 2025, Wotherspoon signed a one-year contract with Barys Astana of the Kontinental Hockey League. He was released on December 21, 2025, after suffering a knee injury that required surgery and a lengthy recovery.

== International play ==
Internationally, Wotherspoon first represented Hockey Canada as part of team Canada Pacific at the 2010 World U-17 Hockey Challenge finishing fifth overall at the conclusion of tournament play.

In December 2012, Wotherspoon was named to the Canadian national junior team ahead of the annual World Junior Championships, where his country ultimately failed to secure a podium finish after dropping the bronze medal game to Russia in overtime.

In January 2022, Wotherspoon was selected to play for the Canadian national senior team at the 2022 Winter Olympics held in Beijing, China.

== Personal life ==
Wotherspoon's younger brother, Parker, was a fourth round selection by the New York Islanders in the 2015 NHL entry draft and currently plays for the Boston Bruins.

Tyler and his wife, Mishaela, have two children: a daughter, Kolette, and a son, Karter.

== Career statistics ==
=== Regular season and playoffs ===
| | | | Regular season | | | | | Playoffs |
| Season | Team | League | GP | G | A | Pts | PIM | GP | G | A | Pts | PIM |
|---|---|---|---|---|---|---|---|---|---|---|---|---|
| 2008–09 | Portland Winter Hawks | WHL | 4 | 0 | 0 | 0 | 0 | — | — | — | — | — |
| 2009–10 | Portland Winterhawks | WHL | 43 | 1 | 4 | 5 | 21 | 2 | 0 | 0 | 0 | 0 |
| 2010–11 | Portland Winterhawks | WHL | 64 | 2 | 10 | 12 | 73 | 20 | 3 | 1 | 4 | 10 |
| 2011–12 | Portland Winterhawks | WHL | 67 | 7 | 21 | 28 | 42 | 22 | 1 | 6 | 7 | 6 |
| 2012–13 | Portland Winterhawks | WHL | 61 | 7 | 30 | 37 | 30 | 21 | 2 | 8 | 10 | 20 |
| 2013–14 | Abbotsford Heat | AHL | 48 | 1 | 8 | 9 | 12 | — | — | — | — | — |
| 2013–14 | Calgary Flames | NHL | 14 | 0 | 4 | 4 | 4 | — | — | — | — | — |
| 2014–15 | Adirondack Flames | AHL | 61 | 2 | 22 | 24 | 20 | — | — | — | — | — |
| 2014–15 | Calgary Flames | NHL | 1 | 0 | 0 | 0 | 0 | 6 | 0 | 0 | 0 | 0 |
| 2015–16 | Stockton Heat | AHL | 53 | 2 | 8 | 10 | 16 | — | — | — | — | — |
| 2015–16 | Calgary Flames | NHL | 11 | 0 | 1 | 1 | 0 | — | — | — | — | — |
| 2016–17 | Stockton Heat | AHL | 56 | 6 | 12 | 18 | 24 | 5 | 0 | 0 | 0 | 2 |
| 2016–17 | Calgary Flames | NHL | 4 | 0 | 0 | 0 | 0 | — | — | — | — | — |
| 2017–18 | Stockton Heat | AHL | 67 | 7 | 30 | 37 | 46 | — | — | — | — | — |
| 2018–19 | San Antonio Rampage | AHL | 70 | 4 | 18 | 22 | 28 | — | — | — | — | — |
| 2019–20 | Lehigh Valley Phantoms | AHL | 54 | 4 | 18 | 22 | 26 | — | — | — | — | — |
| 2020–21 | Lehigh Valley Phantoms | AHL | 24 | 0 | 6 | 6 | 18 | — | — | — | — | — |
| 2021–22 | Utica Comets | AHL | 53 | 3 | 17 | 20 | 22 | 5 | 0 | 0 | 0 | 0 |
| 2022–23 | Utica Comets | AHL | 65 | 4 | 17 | 21 | 22 | 6 | 0 | 2 | 2 | 6 |
| 2023–24 | Utica Comets | AHL | 65 | 4 | 18 | 22 | 20 | — | — | — | — | — |
| 2024–25 | Laval Rocket | AHL | 72 | 2 | 16 | 18 | 10 | 7 | 0 | 0 | 0 | 2 |
| 2025–26 | Barys Astana | KHL | 9 | 0 | 0 | 0 | 0 | — | — | — | — | — |
| NHL totals | | | 30 | 0 | 5 | 5 | 4 | 6 | 0 | 0 | 0 | 0 |

=== International ===
| Year | Team | Event | Result | GP | G | A | Pts | PIM |
|---|---|---|---|---|---|---|---|---|
| 2010 | Canada Pacific | U17 | 5th | 5 | 0 | 0 | 0 | 4 |
| 2013 | Canada | WJC | 4th | 6 | 1 | 1 | 2 | 0 |
| 2022 | Canada | OG | 6th | 5 | 0 | 2 | 2 | 2 |
| Junior totals | | | | 11 | 1 | 1 | 2 | 4 |
| Senior totals | | | | 5 | 0 | 2 | 2 | 2 |

== Awards and honours ==
| Award | Year | Ref |
|---|---|---|
CHL
| CHL/NHL Top Prospects Game | 2011 | |
WHL
| Ed Chynoweth Cup champion | 2013 | |
| West Second All-Star Team | 2013 | |
