= Ty Rattie =

Canadian ice hockey player (born 1993)

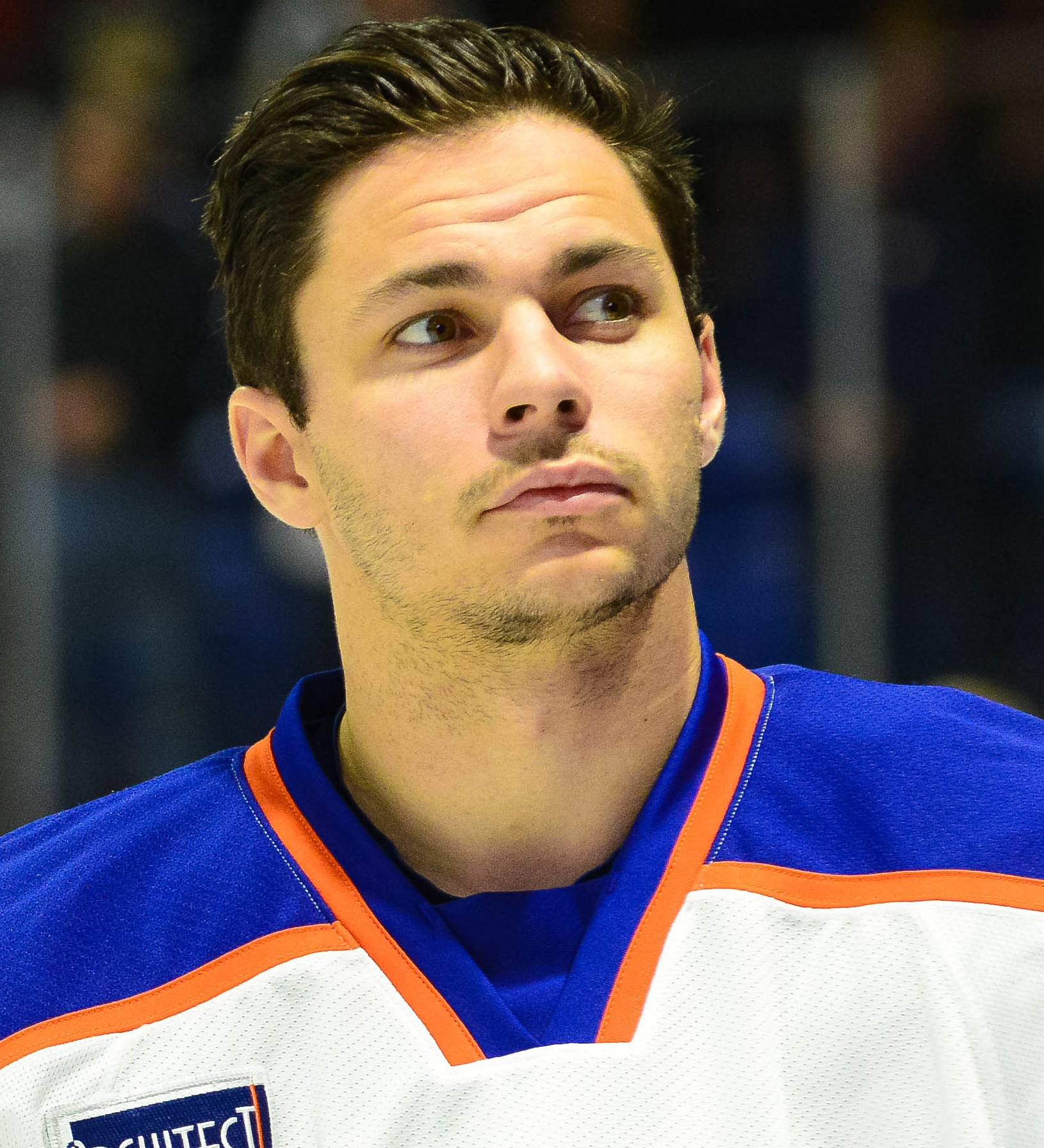
- Rattie with the Bakersfield Condors in 2018
- Born: February 5, 1993 (age 33) Airdrie, Alberta, Canada
- Height: 5 ft 11 in (180 cm)
- Weight: 170 lb (77 kg; 12 st 2 lb)
- Position: Right wing
- Shoots: Right
- SHL team Former teams: Linköping HC; St. Louis Blues; Carolina Hurricanes; Edmonton Oilers; Lokomotiv Yaroslavl; Torpedo Nizhny Novgorod; Ässät; Timrå IK
- NHL draft: 32nd overall, 2011; St. Louis Blues
- Playing career: 2013–present

Ty Rattie (born February 5, 1993) is a Canadian professional ice hockey forward who is currently playing for Linköping HC of the Swedish Hockey League (SHL).

== Playing career ==
In June 2011, the St. Louis Blues made Rattie their first draft pick and the 32nd overall in the 2011 NHL entry draft. He was ranked 17th among draft eligible prospects by Central Scouting. Blues' scouting director Bill Armstrong stated that he was "someone that we liked because of his high skill level. Obviously, he's got some work to do as far as his strength, but he has been able to put up points his whole life at every level." Rattie was the first draft pick Armstrong made as the Blues' scouting director.

Rattie was raised in Airdrie, Alberta. The Winterhawks made Rattie the 2nd overall selection in the 2008 WHL Bantam Draft, behind only Ryan Nugent-Hopkins, who was drafted first overall in the 2011 NHL Entry Draft. During the Winterhawks 2010–11 season, Rattie had 28 goals and 51 assists in 67 games; he was a playoff scoring leader with 22 points (9 goals, 13 assists) and "led Portland with a plus-11 rating in 21 playoff games" as they reached the WHL finals.

In 2011–12, Rattie was named Canadian Hockey League player of the week for the week of November 21 to November 27. He was also named WHL player of the month for November, for scoring 16 goals and 28 points in 11 games. In the 2012–13 WHL season, after the Winterhawks won the WHL championship, Rattie was awarded the airBC Trophy after being named the 2013 WHL Playoff MVP.

He made his NHL debut with the St. Louis Blues on April 11, 2014, against the Dallas Stars. During the 2015–16 season, Rattie scored his first NHL goal on January 12, 2016 against the New Jersey Devils.

Rattie is a player who could stickhandle his way out of a phone booth. He’s not the fastest and he’s certainly not the strongest but he always seems to win space and he simply knows exactly what to do with that space around the puck. He has an excellent release on his shot and places the puck very well. He tends to lean heavier on shooting the puck rather than passing the puck but he can surprise with his creativity and underrated playmaking ability."

— International Scouting Services

In the following 2016–17 season, Rattie made the Blues opening night roster out of training camp. After playing in just 4 games with the Blues through to the new year, Rattie was placed on waivers for the first time on January 3, 2017. On the following day, Rattie was claimed off waivers by the Carolina Hurricanes. Over the following month, Rattie proceeded to play in just 5 games with the Hurricanes recording 2 assists. On February 19, he was re-claimed by the Blues off waivers. He was immediately reassigned to the Wolves.

On July 1, 2017, Rattie signed a one-year, two-way contract with the Edmonton Oilers after he was not tendered a qualifying offer from the Blues. On April 14, 2018, Rattie signed a one-year contract extension with the Oilers.

On January 21, 2019, Rattie was placed on waivers along with Ryan Spooner.

On June 25, 2019, Rattie was not tendered a qualifying offer from the Oilers, releasing him as a free agent. He joined former Oilers executive and newly installed head coach Craig MacTavish in signing a one-year contract abroad with Russian club, Lokomotiv Yaroslavl of the KHL, on July 10, 2019. In the 2019–20 season, Rattie made a slow transition to the KHL, collecting 3 goals through his first 16 games. With the dismissal Craig McTavish as head coach, Rattie soon left Lokomotiv as he was traded to Torpedo Nizhny Novgorod on October 29, 2019. He regained his scoring touch with Torpedo, finishing the season with 25 points in 36 games.

== Career statistics ==
=== Regular season and playoffs ===
			Regular season					Playoffs
Season	Team	League	GP	G	A	Pts	PIM	GP	G	A	Pts	PIM
2008–09	Brooks Bandits	AJHL	2	0	0	0	0	2	0	1	1	0
2008–09	Portland Winterhawks	WHL	10	1	0	1	0	—	—	—	—	—
2009–10	Portland Winterhawks	WHL	61	17	20	37	38	13	2	2	4	12
2010–11	Portland Winterhawks	WHL	67	28	51	79	55	21	9	13	22	22
2011–12	Portland Winterhawks	WHL	69	57	64	121	54	21	19	14	33	12
2012–13	Portland Winterhawks	WHL	62	48	62	110	27	21	20	16	36	17
2013–14	Chicago Wolves	AHL	72	31	17	48	37	9	1	2	3	4
2013–14	St. Louis Blues	NHL	2	0	0	0	0	—	—	—	—	—
2014–15	Chicago Wolves	AHL	59	21	21	42	12	3	0	0	0	2
2014–15	St. Louis Blues	NHL	11	0	2	2	2	—	—	—	—	—
2015–16	Chicago Wolves	AHL	62	17	29	46	28	—	—	—	—	—
2015–16	St. Louis Blues	NHL	13	4	2	6	4	—	—	—	—	—
2016–17	St. Louis Blues	NHL	4	0	0	0	0	—	—	—	—	—
2016–17	Carolina Hurricanes	NHL	5	0	2	2	0	—	—	—	—	—
2016–17	Chicago Wolves	AHL	22	2	3	5	2	9	2	2	4	14
2017–18	Bakersfield Condors	AHL	53	21	22	43	24	—	—	—	—	—
2017–18	Edmonton Oilers	NHL	14	5	4	9	2	—	—	—	—	—
2018–19	Edmonton Oilers	NHL	50	4	7	11	4	—	—	—	—	—
2019–20	Lokomotiv Yaroslavl	KHL	16	3	6	9	4	—	—	—	—	—
2019–20	Torpedo Nizhny Novgorod	KHL	36	8	17	25	16	3	0	0	0	24
2020–21	Ässät	Liiga	28	7	9	16	6	—	—	—	—	—
2021–22	Timrå IK	SHL	51	21	26	47	32	—	—	—	—	—
2022–23	Linköping HC	SHL	52	18	16	34	10	—	—	—	—	—
2023–24	Linköping HC	SHL	52	21	26	47	18	4	1	2	3	0
2024–25	Linköping HC	SHL	52	13	24	37	14	—	—	—	—	—
NHL totals			99	13	17	30	12	—	—	—	—	—
SHL totals			207	73	92	165	74	4	1	2	3	0

=== International ===
Year	Team	Event	Result	GP	G	A	Pts	PIM
2010	Canada Pacific	U17	5th	5	2	7	9	6
2013	Canada	WJC	4th	6	3	0	3	0
Junior totals				11	5	7	12	6

== Awards and honours ==
Award	Year
AMBHL
Rookie of the Year	2007
MVP	2008
Top Forward	2008
League record for goals (75 in 33)	2008
WHL
CHL Top Prospects Game	2011
CHL Player of the week, November 21–27	2011
West First All-Star Team	2012
West Second All-Star Team	2013
Playoff MVP	2013
CHL Memorial Cup All-Star Team	2013
AHL
All-Star Game	2015
