= Jonathan Drouin =

Canadian ice hockey player (born 1995)

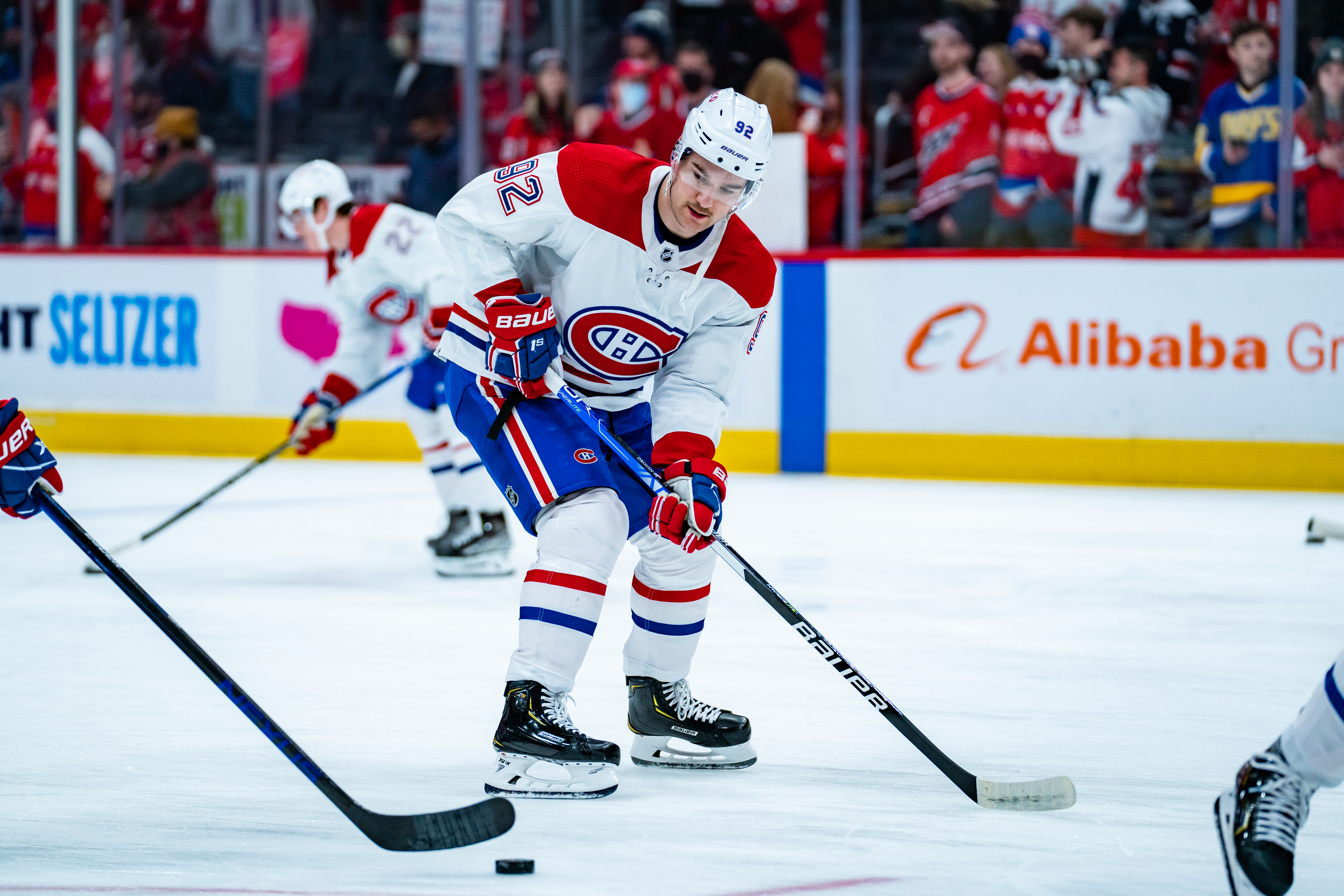
- Drouin with the Montreal Canadiens in November 2021
- Born: March 28, 1995 (age 31) Sainte-Agathe-des-Monts, Quebec, Canada
- Height: 5 ft 11 in (180 cm)
- Weight: 201 lb (91 kg; 14 st 5 lb)
- Position: Forward
- Shoots: Left
- NHL team Former teams: Free agent Tampa Bay Lightning; Montreal Canadiens; Colorado Avalanche; New York Islanders; St. Louis Blues
- NHL draft: 3rd overall, 2013; Tampa Bay Lightning
- Playing career: 2014–present

Jonathan Drouin (born March 28, 1995) is a Canadian professional ice hockey player who is currently an unrestricted free agent. He most recently played with the St. Louis Blues in the National Hockey League (NHL). Drouin was selected in the first round, third overall, by the Tampa Bay Lightning in the 2013 NHL entry draft. He has also played for the Montreal Canadiens, Colorado Avalanche, and New York Islanders.

== Playing career ==
As a youth, Drouin played in the 2008 Quebec International Pee-Wee Hockey Tournament with the Northern Selects minor ice hockey team.

=== Halifax Mooseheads ===
Drouin was drafted second overall by the Halifax Mooseheads in the 2011 Quebec Major Junior Hockey League (QMJHL) entry draft. After starting the 2011–12 season at the Midget AAA level with the Lac St-Louis Lions of the Quebec Junior AAA Hockey League (QMAAA), it was announced on December 9, 2011 that Drouin would join the Mooseheads. In his first QMJHL game, against the Acadie-Bathurst Titan, Drouin recorded two assists, including a set-up of the game-winning goal. Drouin was also a key member of Halifax's 2012 playoff success, most notably scoring the overtime winning goal in Game 7 against the Quebec Remparts.

On November 7, 2012, Drouin represented Team QMJHL in Game 2 of the Subway Super Series against Russian junior players; he scored a goal and added three assists. Drouin missed the first game of the series due to a foot injury. At the conclusion of the 2012–13 season, Drouin was named the CHL Player of the Year. He would continue to be an integral player for the Mooseheads during the 2013 playoffs, helping the team win the President's Cup and the 2013 Memorial Cup.

On June 30, 2013, after his highly-successful season, Drouin was drafted by the Tampa Bay Lightning in the first round, third overall in the 2013 NHL entry draft. Days later, on July 5, he was signed to a three-year contract by the Lightning. However, Drouin was cut from the Lightning roster at the beginning of the 2013–14 season, returning to the Mooseheads for the QMJHL season.

=== Professional (2014–present) ===
==== Tampa Bay Lightning (2014–2017) ====
During the Lightning's 2014–15 training camp, Drouin sustained an injury. Days later, on September 9, 2014, the Lightning announced Drouin would miss three-to-four weeks with a slight fracture in his thumb. On October 16, Drouin was assigned to Tampa Bay's American Hockey League (AHL) affiliate, the Syracuse Crunch, on a conditioning stint. The rehabilitation assignment was initially slated for a maximum of two weeks, though it was stated he could be recalled prior to that timeline. However, just three days later on October 19, the Lightning recalled Drouin from his conditioning assignment with the Crunch; he registered one goal, two assists and a +4 plus-minus rating during his AHL stint.

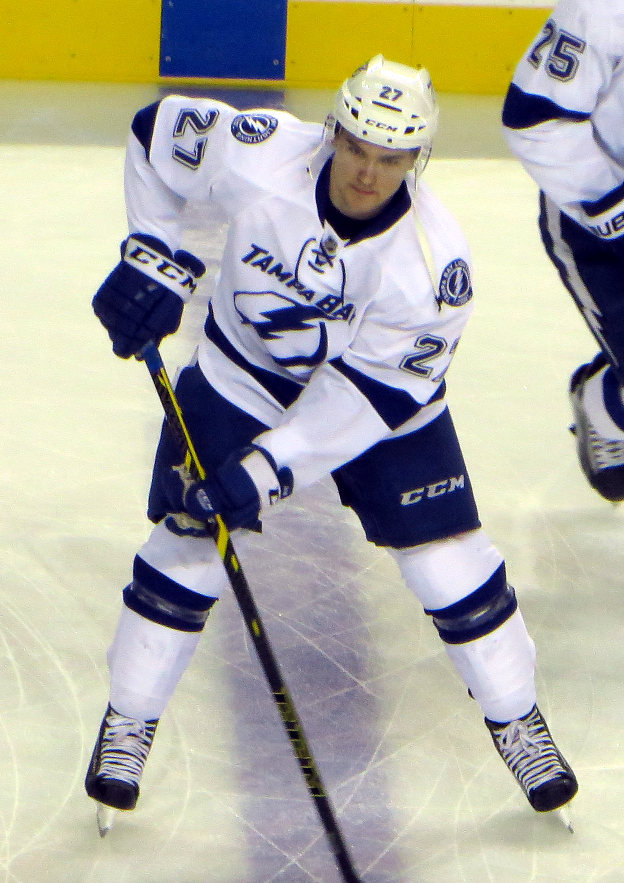
Drouin during his tenure with the Tampa Bay Lightning in October 2014

On October 20, 2014, Drouin made his NHL debut against the Edmonton Oilers. The following day, he recorded his first NHL assist on a Valtteri Filppula goal in Tampa Bay's 2–1 overtime victory over the Calgary Flames. He then scored his first NHL goal on October 24 against goaltender Ondřej Pavelec of the Winnipeg Jets. Drouin finished the 2014–15 season, his rookie season, playing in 70 games with four goals, 28 assists and 32 points. After being a healthy scratch for the first three games in the first round of the 2015 playoffs, Drouin made his Stanley Cup playoff debut on April 23, 2015, in Game four against the Detroit Red Wings. As the playoffs went on, the Lightning would reach the Stanley Cup Finals where they would fall in six games to the Chicago Blackhawks. Drouin would finish his first playoff with six games played with no points

On January 2, 2016, Drouin was reassigned to the Syracuse Crunch. Due to injury, he had been limited to only 19 games in the 2015–16 season, and had only played in five games since mid-November. Lightning general manager Steve Yzerman stated at the time there was no set date for his return to the NHL. Yzerman also stated, "[H]e's been dealing with a minor nagging injury that is finally healed. With everyone coming back at the same time, it's a good opportunity to get a young player a lot of ice time, get his game right back on top and bring him back at the appropriate time." On January 3, Drouin's agent, Allan Walsh, issued a statement on his behalf, revealing that Drouin had made a trade request in November 2015, but had kept the matter private. Walsh referred to it as an "untenable situation" and that it was in everyone's best interest that Drouin be allowed to move on and play hockey. On January 20, the Lightning announced Drouin had been suspended indefinitely without pay for a failure to report to the Crunch's game against the Toronto Marlies that day. Drouin's agent Allan Walsh again issued another statement after the suspension was announced by the Lightning. According to Walsh, a few days prior, the Lightning had informed Drouin a trade was close to being completed. Walsh proposed to the team that Drouin not play due to the impending trade; however, the Lightning decided against this. Walsh further stated Drouin was not willing to risk being injured, and that due to the situation "it is clearly in the best interests that the Tampa Bay Lightning trade Jonathan as there is no reason for Jonathan to continue with the Tampa Bay Lightning organization in any capacity". Lightning GM Steve Yzerman held a press conference the following day, denying Walsh's claim there was a trade nearing. Yzerman stated, "We've never said there was a pending deal or a deal close." Yzerman further stated the Lightning were still "actively and aggressively trying to find a deal that works" to trade Drouin. According to Yzerman, there was still "significant" interest from teams, but the way things have played out would make a trade more difficult to make. Yzerman also reiterated his point that he is working for the best interest of the team, and that Drouin's actions put no pressure on him to make a trade. On March 8, Drouin reported to the Crunch for the first time since he was suspended by the Lightning on January 20. Drouin told the media he believed the relationship between him and the team was fine, and that they would fix the situation over the summer. Drouin also said he planned on putting in the work to try to gain a call-up. On April 4, the Lightning recalled Drouin from Syracuse after a nine-game stint. He had recorded nine goals and one assist during his recent stint with the Crunch. Three days later, Drouin recorded the game-winning goal in his return. Drouin helped the Lightning defeat the New Jersey Devils, which resulted in the Lightning clinching home ice for the opening round of the 2016 playoffs for their second consecutive first round matchup against the Detroit Red Wings. On April 15, Drouin recorded his first career NHL playoff assist and point on a Brian Boyle goal in a 5–2 Lightning victory over the Red Wings. On April 30, Drouin recorded his first NHL playoff goal in a 4–1 Lightning win over the New York Islanders. Drouin became the fourth Lightning player whose first NHL playoff goal was a game-winning goal. After the Lightning defeated the Islanders in the second round, they would face the Pittsburgh Penguins in the Eastern Conference Finals where they would be defeated by the Penguins in seven games, one win short from a second straight appearance in the Stanley Cup Finals. Drouin finished the 2016 playoffs with five goals, nine assists for 14 points in all 17 games played.

Drouin had a breakout season during the 2016–17 season where he played 73 contests with 21 goals, 32 assists and 53 points recorded as the Lightning would miss the 2017 playoffs by one point in the standings, marking the first time since 2013 where the team failed to qualify for the playoffs.

==== Montreal Canadiens (2017–2023) ====
On June 15, 2017, Drouin was traded by the Lightning, along with a conditional 2018 sixth-round draft pick, to the Montreal Canadiens in exchange for prospect Mikhail Sergachev and a conditional 2018 second-round pick. As a restricted free agent, he was then promptly signed to a six-year, $33 million contract with the Canadiens. He took the number 92 jersey.

In the 2018–19 season, his second season with the Canadiens, Drouin matched his career-high points (18 goals, 35 assists for 53 total points in 81 games) despite only scoring two points in his final 18 games. On May 1, 2019, Drouin underwent surgery for a nose fracture, which forced him to withdraw from the 2019 World Championship.

Drouin scored his first goal of the 2019–20 season in a 6–5 shootout victory against the Toronto Maple Leafs on October 5, 2019. Drouin injured his wrist in a game against the Washington Capitals on November 15, 2019. He did not return from the injury until February 8, 2020, against the Toronto Maple Leafs after missing 37 games.

Drouin had a strong beginning to the pandemic-shortened 2020–21 season with the Canadiens, producing at almost a point-per-game pace in the first ten games of the season, and registering 2 goals and 9 assists in his first 18 games. Over the next 26 games, however, he registered only 12 assists as he began to struggle with health issues. On April 28, 2021, it was announced that Drouin was taking a leave of absence for personal reasons. He later revealed that he had been suffering from anxiety and insomnia during much of the seasons, issues that had been longstanding but which worsened considerably during the season. He missed the remaining 12 games of the regular season and the entirety of the Canadiens' surprisingly deep run to the 2021 Stanley Cup Finals where they would fall in five games to Drouin's former team, the Tampa Bay Lightning. The Canadiens submitted him for consideration for the King Clancy Memorial Trophy at the end of the regular season, in recognition of his charitable work.

Returning to the Canadiens for the 2021–22 season, Drouin was placed on the team's second line alongside close friend Josh Anderson and newcomer Christian Dvorak. In the season-opening game against the Toronto Maple Leafs on October 13, 2021, Drouin scored the Canadiens' first goal of the season off an assist from Anderson. He led the team in points through the first eleven games of the season, registering two goals and five assists, before withdrawing from a November 2 game against the Detroit Red Wings after taking a puck to the head. He was not diagnosed with a concussion, but suffered from headaches and as a result missed six games before returning to the lineup on November 16. On January 18, 2022, Drouin received a game misconduct for cross-checking Tyler Seguin in a mid-season game against the Dallas Stars. On January 22, Drouin was placed on injured reserve status with an upper body injury. He returned to the roster in late March, but was returned to the injured reserve roster soon after with an upper body injury. Drouin underwent wrist surgery, bringing his season to an end.

Drouin was a healthy scratch by head coach Martin St. Louis to begin the 2022–23 season, the final year of his contract with the Canadiens. While recording many assists, he notably went goalless for much of the season, to the point of it becoming a story in the media. He ultimately scored his first goal of the season on March 3, in a game against the Anaheim Ducks. Drouin continued to struggle with injuries, ultimately appearing in 58 games, and recording 2 goals and 27 assists for 29 points, the latter second on the team behind captain Nick Suzuki.

==== Colorado Avalanche (2023–2025) ====
As an unrestricted free agent following six seasons with the Canadiens, Drouin signed a one-year, $825,000 contract with the Colorado Avalanche on July 1, 2023. The signing marked a fresh start for Drouin, which reunited him with former Mooseheads teammate Nathan MacKinnon.

Drouin made his Avalanche debut on October 11, 2023, registering an assist on the top-line in a 2023–24 season-opening win against the Los Angeles Kings. Initially struggling to contribute, Drouin was a healthy scratch after 8 games before returning to the lineup and notching his first goal with the Avalanche in his 12th appearance during a 5–1 victory over the Seattle Kraken on November 13, 2023. Rejuvenating his game with the Avalanche, Drouin increased his offensive output and thrived in a top-six role. He notched his 300th career point, during a multi-goal performance against the Dallas Stars on January 4, 2024. Over the course of the season, he appeared in 79 games, tallying 19 goals and 37 assists for a career-high 56 points. His contributions ranked fourth in team scoring and included a personal best of 18:11 average time on ice per game. During the final regular season contest against the Edmonton Oilers, Drouin suffered a lower body injury and was ruled out for the entirety of the first-round playoff series against the Winnipeg Jets. After missing the first 8 playoff games, he returned in the Division Finals against the Dallas Stars, registering an assist in each of his 3 appearances, however was unable to prevent the Avalanche from elimination in 6 games.

As a pending free agent, Drouin opted to remain with the Avalanche by re-signing to a team friendly one-year, $2.5 million contract extension on July 1, 2024. Entering his second season with Colorado, Drouin was injured in the season opener for the following 2024–25 campaign against the Vegas Golden Knights on October 9, 2024. Later placed on injured-reserve, Drouin missed 16 games before returning against the Washington Capitals on November 12, 2024.

==== New York Islanders (2025–2026) ====
The New York Islanders signed Drouin as a free agent to a two-year, $8 million contract on July 1, 2025.

==== St. Louis Blues (2026) ====
At the trade deadline, the Islanders traded Drouin, a 2026 first-round pick, a 2026 third-round pick, and prospect Marcus Gidlof to the St. Louis Blues in exchange for Brayden Schenn. With the Blues on the outside of contention for the playoffs, Drouin played out the remainder of the regular season with the Blues posting a goal and two assists through nine games.

On June 30, 2026, the Blues placed Drouin on unconditional waivers with the intention to buy out the final year of Drouin’s contract, making him an unrestricted free agent effective July 1, 2026.

== International play ==
Medal record

Men's ice hockey

Representing Canada

Ivan Hlinka Memorial Tournament
Gold medal – first place	2012 Piešťany	

Drouin won a gold medal at the 2012 Ivan Hlinka Memorial Tournament as a member of Canada under-18 team. He later represented Canada junior team, along with Mooseheads teammate Nathan MacKinnon, at the 2013 World Junior Championships, where Canada finished fourth.

== Personal life ==
Drouin and his girlfriend Marie-Laurence had their first child together on February 17, 2022.

== Career statistics ==
=== Regular season and playoffs ===
			Regular season					Playoffs
Season	Team	League	GP	G	A	Pts	PIM	GP	G	A	Pts	PIM
2010–11	Lac St-Louis Lions	QMAAA	38	22	36	58	38	15	11	17	28	18
2011–12	Lac St-Louis Lions	QMAAA	22	22	31	53	35	—	—	—	—	—
2011–12	Halifax Mooseheads	QMJHL	33	7	22	29	12	17	9	17	26	4
2012–13	Halifax Mooseheads	QMJHL	49	41	64	105	32	17	12	23	35	14
2013–14	Halifax Mooseheads	QMJHL	46	29	79	108	43	16	13	28	41	18
2014–15	Syracuse Crunch	AHL	2	1	2	3	0	—	—	—	—	—
2014–15	Tampa Bay Lightning	NHL	70	4	28	32	34	6	0	0	0	2
2015–16	Tampa Bay Lightning	NHL	21	4	6	10	4	17	5	9	14	14
2015–16	Syracuse Crunch	AHL	17	11	2	13	12	—	—	—	—	—
2016–17	Tampa Bay Lightning	NHL	73	21	32	53	16	—	—	—	—	—
2017–18	Montreal Canadiens	NHL	77	13	33	46	30	—	—	—	—	—
2018–19	Montreal Canadiens	NHL	81	18	35	53	26	—	—	—	—	—
2019–20	Montreal Canadiens	NHL	27	7	8	15	14	10	1	6	7	8
2020–21	Montreal Canadiens	NHL	44	2	21	23	20	—	—	—	—	—
2021–22	Montreal Canadiens	NHL	34	6	14	20	23	—	—	—	—	—
2022–23	Montreal Canadiens	NHL	58	2	27	29	18	—	—	—	—	—
2023–24	Colorado Avalanche	NHL	79	19	37	56	28	3	0	3	3	2
2024–25	Colorado Avalanche	NHL	43	11	26	37	6	7	0	3	3	0
2025–26	New York Islanders	NHL	55	3	18	21	19	—	—	—	—	—
2025–26	St. Louis Blues	NHL	9	1	2	3	0	—	—	—	—	—
NHL totals			671	111	287	398	238	43	6	21	27	26

=== International ===
Year	Team	Event	Result	GP	G	A	Pts	PIM
2012	Canada Quebec	U17	6th	4	2	3	5	2
2012	Canada	IH18	1st place, gold medalist(s)	5	0	5	5	2
2013	Canada	WJC	4th	6	2	2	4	0
2014	Canada	WJC	4th	7	3	6	9	24
2016	Team North America	WCH	5th	3	1	0	1	0
Junior totals				22	7	16	23	28
Senior totals				3	1	0	1	0

== Awards and honours ==
Award	Year	Ref
QMJHL
Mike Bossy Trophy	2013	
Paul Dumont Trophy	2013	
Michel Brière Memorial Trophy	2013	
First All-Star Team	2013, 2014	
CHL
Memorial Cup champion	2013	
CHL Player of the Year	2013	
NHL
NHL All-Star Skills Competition	2015	
NHL Fastest Skater	2015	

Awards and achievements
Preceded by Andrei Vasilevskiy	Tampa Bay Lightning first-round draft pick 2013	Succeeded by Tony DeAngelo
