= 2021–22 Ukrainian Hockey League season =

- League: Ukrainian Hockey Championship
- Sport: Ice hockey
- Duration: 17 September 2021 – 24 February 2022
- Number of teams: 5 (8 in the start of the season)

Regular season

Playoffs

Finals

Ukrainian Hockey League seasons
- ← 2020–21 2022–23 →

The 2021–22 Ukrainian Hockey League season is the 30th season of the Ukrainian Hockey Championship. Eight teams participated in the league in the start of the season.

The season was marked by a split in Ukrainian hockey - on 24 November 2021, 4 clubs, including the holding champions HC Donbass, left the league and announced the creation of the Ukrainian Hockey Super League. On November 30, FC BSFK entered the league. On January 8, Rulav Oddr also left the league, although it was announced that the club was renamed Kharkiv Berserkers. On February 24, the season was suspended as a result of the Russian invasion of Ukraine.

== 2021–22 racism controversy ==
On September 26, 2021, Kremenchuk and Ukraine national hockey team forward Andri Deniskin made a racist gesture of eating a banana in front of Jalen Smereck. Smereck, who is black, took offence to this and so did many other black players. Current and former NHL players Nazem Kadri, J.T. Brown, Anthony Duclair, Georges Laraque and Akim Aliu came to Smereck's support, along with them at the time UHL general manager Yevgeni (Eugene) Kolychev also came to his aide. On September 29, Deniskin was given a 13-game suspension with an option to void 10 games of it for the Ukrainian equivalent of US$1,870. This outraged many hockey fans, players and teams alike, and due to this Smereck stated that he wouldn't play in the UHL until Deniskin was given a heavier punishment. On September 30, 2021, the aforementioned Kolychev was fired by the league, causing more outrage online. However, he stated he will continue supporting Smereck regardless. On October 10, 2021, Smereck and Donbass agreed to a mutual termination, ending his time in the UHL.

== Teams ==
Location of teams in 2021–22 Ukrainian Hockey League.
The team in italics are from a conflict zone of the war in Donbas and play
Teams with strikethrough names left the league.

Team	Home city	Founded	Arena	Capacity
Dnipro Kherson	Kherson	1999	Favorite Arena	400
Kremenchuk	Kremenchuk	2010	Aisberg Arena	1000
Rulav Oddr	Kharkiv	2020	Dafi Ice Hall Kharkov	1,500
Sokil Kyiv	Kyiv	1963 (reestablished in 2020)	Palace of Sports, Kyiv	7513
After 24 November 2021
HC BSFK	Brovary			
Before 24 November 2021
Bilyi Bars	Bila Tserkva	2008	Ice Arena Bila Tserkva	500
Donbass	Druzhkivka	2005	Altair Arena	400
Kramatorsk	Kramatorsk	2020	Serhiy Petrov Ice Arena KOVZANKA	430
Mariupol (before 24 November 2021)	Mariupol	2020	Mariupol Ice Center	300

== Withdrawal of clubs from the league and creation of the Ukrainian Hockey Super League ==
On 16 November 2021, the Disciplinary Committee of the Ice Hockey Federation of Ukraine suspended seven players of HC Donbass and HC Kramatorsk, who left the location of the Ukraine national team, from participation in official matches. On the same day, the creation of the Ukrainian Hockey Super League was announced, whose founding members became UHL clubs HC Donbass, HC Kramatorsk, Bilyi Bars and HC Mariupol.

On 24 November, HC Donbass and HC Kramatorsk were excluded from the Ukrainian Hockey League due to the continued participation of disqualified players in official games despite the decision of the Disciplinary Committee. On the same day, HC Mariupol and Bilyi Bars withdrew from the league.

On 8 December, the new Ukrainian Hockey Super League season started.

On 30 November, HC BSFK was announced as the fifth club. The season resumed on December 2.

On 8 January 2022, Rulav Oddr was announced to be renamed Kharkiv Berserkers. On the same day, the club announced its withdrawal from the league, and also denied the information about the renaming of the team.

== Regular season ==
Pos	Team	Pld	W	OTW	OTL	L	GF	GA	GD	Pts	Final Result
1	Sokil Kyiv	28	23	1	0	4	158	58	+100	48	
2	Kremenchuk	25	15	4	0	6	113	60	+53	38	
3	Dnipro Kherson	26	9	2	4	11	73	94	−21	26	
4	Kharkiv Berserkers	26	6	3	4	13	71	106	−35	22	
5	HC BSFK	27	1	2	4	20	56	153	−97	10	
6	Donbass	0	0	0	0	0	0	0	0	0	Excluded from the tournament
7	Kramatorsk	0	0	0	0	0	0	0	0	0	Excluded from the tournament
8	Bilyi Bars	0	0	0	0	0	0	0	0	0	Withdrew from the tournament
9	Mariupol	0	0	0	0	0	0	0	0	0	Withdrew from the tournament

Updated to match(es) played on 23 February 2022. Source: UHL

== Results ==
Home	Away									
Home	Bilyi Bars	HC BSFK	Donbass	Dnipro	Kharkiv Berserkers	Kramatorsk	Kremenchuk	Mariupol	Rulav Oddr	Sokil Kyiv
Bilyi Bars	–		0–5	3–2 GWS		1–4; 2–9		2–11	3–4; 0–1	1–9
HC BSFK		–		0–4; 3–7	4–3 GWS; 4–5 GWS		4–8			1–9; 4–5 GWS; 1–3
Donbass	12–2; 5–1		–	4–1		5–2; 2–0	0–1 OT	4–1; 5–1	5–2	5–4; 6–4
Dnipro Kherson	4–2; 3–2 OT	4–3 OT	1–5; 1–3	–	3–0; 6–2	2–1 OT; 1–2	0–4; 3–4 OT; 1–4	2–7; 1–2 OT	5–0 (w/o); 3–7	2–9; 1–5; 2–1; 3–5
Kharkiv Berserkers		4–2		4–3 OT	–		3–4 GWS; 2–3 GWS; 4–5 GWS			1–6; 2–5
Kramatorsk	6–2; 4–3		0–6	3–1		–	2–5	3–7		2–4
Kremenchuk	10–1; 11–1	6–0; 4–6; 2–1	3–2; 2–5	7–0; 6–2	5–2	2–3 GWS; 1–5	–	1–2; 1–0 GWS	6–1; 4–3	2–4; 2–5; 2–3
Mariupol	7–0; 8–3			8–1		2–7	4–2	–	1–0; 5–2	0–2; 4–3 OT
Rulav Oddr	4–2; 8–0		0–3	3–2 GWS		0–4; 2–3 OT	2–4	2–1 OT	–	3–5
Sokil Kyiv	5–2	9–4; 6–1	7–6	7–5; 3–4; 6–1	11–0	3–1; 4–2	2–4; 2–3; 6–2	5–3	7–0; 4–3	–
OT - Overtime. GWS - Shootout. Source:UHL
