= Scott Harrington (ice hockey) =

Canadian ice hockey player (born 1993)

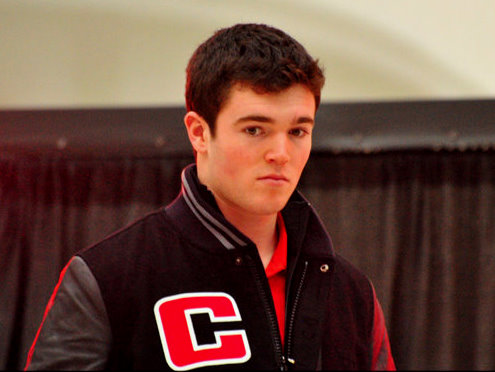
- Harrington in 2012
- Born: March 10, 1993 (age 33) Kingston, Ontario, Canada
- Height: 6 ft 2 in (188 cm)
- Weight: 204 lb (93 kg; 14 st 8 lb)
- Position: Defence
- Shoots: Left
- AHL team Former teams: Belleville Senators; Pittsburgh Penguins; Toronto Maple Leafs; Columbus Blue Jackets; San Jose Sharks; Anaheim Ducks; ZSC Lions
- NHL draft: 54th overall, 2011; Pittsburgh Penguins
- Playing career: 2013–present

Scott Harrington (born March 10, 1993) is a Canadian professional ice hockey player who is a defenceman and captain for the Belleville Senators of the American Hockey League (AHL). Harrington was selected by the Pittsburgh Penguins of the National Hockey League (NHL) in the second round, 54th overall, of the 2011 NHL entry draft. He has also played for the Toronto Maple Leafs, Columbus Blue Jackets, San Jose Sharks, and Anaheim Ducks of the NHL and the ZSC Lions of the Swiss National League.

== Early life ==
Harrington was born on March 10, 1993, in Kingston, Ontario, to parents Pat and Cindy. His younger sister Holly also played ice hockey growing up.

== Playing career ==
=== Amateur ===
Harrington was selected by the London Knights of the Ontario Hockey League (OHL) in the first round, 19th overall, of the 2009 OHL draft. He made his OHL debut in the 2009–10 season, appearing in 55 games, scoring one goal and 13 assists for 14 points. He was named to the league's 2010 First All-Rookie Team. The Knights qualified for the playoffs and advanced to the Western Conference semifinals where they were eliminated by the Kitchener Rangers. In 12 playoff games, Harrington added two assists. His second season in 2010–11 saw him score six goals and 22 points, but the Knights were bounced in the first round of the playoffs by eventual champion Owen Sound Attack. In six playoff games, he added one assist. In January 2011, he was among those selected to play in the CHL Top Prospects Game.

In the 2011–12 season, Harrington made 44 appearances, scoring three goals and 26 points. The Knights made the playoffs and advanced to the OHL Finals, where they won the J. Ross Robertson Cup as the league's champions. In 19 playoff games, he added one goal and seven points. As league champions, the Knights represented the OHL in the 2012 Memorial Cup tournament. The Knights advanced to the final where they were defeated by the Shawinigan Cataractes to finish second. He was named an OHL First Team All-Star alongside teammate Michael Houser for the 2011–12 season. He returned to the Knights for his final year of OHL service in the 2012–13 season where he added three goals and 19 points in 50 games. The Knights once again advanced to the OHL Finals where they beat the Barrie Colts to take home consecutive J. Ross Robertson Cups. In 17 playoff games, he added four assists. He was named to the OHL First All-Star Team for the 2012–13 season. The Knights took part in the 2013 Memorial Cup, but were knocked out in the semifinals.

=== Professional ===
==== Pittsburgh Penguins ====
Harrington was drafted by the Pittsburgh Penguins of the National Hockey League (NHL) in the second round, 54th overall, of the 2011 NHL entry draft. He signed a thee-year entry level contract with Pittsburgh on July 26, 2011. After the London Knights finished their season, Harrington joined Pittsburgh's American Hockey League (AHL) affiliate, the Wilkes-Barre/Scranton Penguins on an amateur tryout contract, for their playoff run in 2013. He appeared in two playoff games, scoring one goal.

He attended Pittsburgh's training camp, but was assigned to Wilkes-Barre/Scranton to start the 2013–14 season. He made 76 appearances in the AHL, recording five goals and 24 points. Wilkes-Barre/Scranton finished second in their division and qualified for the playoffs. They advanced to the conference finals, losing to the St. John's Maple Leafs. Harrington played in 16 playoff games, registering one assist. He attended Pittsburgh's 2014 training camp and was one of the team's final cuts, being assigned to Wilkes-Barre/Scranton to start the 2014–15 season. However, his stay in the AHL was short-lived as he was recalled almost immediately on October 10, 2014. He did not appear in any games but spent the next couple of months shuttling between Pittsburgh and Wilkes-Barre/Scranton. Harrington made his NHL debut on December 18, in a 1–0 Pittsburgh overtime win against the Colorado Avalanche. He made ten appearances for Pittsburgh, going scoreless. In 48 games with Wilkes-Barre/Scranton, he added two goals and 12 points. The AHL Penguins finished second in their division again and advanced to the second round of the playoffs where they were knocked out of contention by the Manchester Monarchs. In eight playoff games, he registered one assist.

==== Toronto Maple Leafs ====
On July 1, 2015, Harrington was traded to the Toronto Maple Leafs in a multi-player blockbuster deal for winger Phil Kessel. Following the trade, Harrington impressed at the Maple Leafs' training camp, making the NHL roster for the opening night of the 2015–16 season. He played alongside Jake Gardiner on the third pairing in a 3–1 loss to the Montreal Canadiens. He recorded his first NHL point assisting on Leo Komarov's second period goal in a 5–3 loss to the Canadiens on October 24. He was assigned to Toronto's AHL affiliate, the Toronto Marlies on November 28. In 15 games with the Maple Leafs he tallied the one assist. He recorded one goal and three points in 17 games with the Marlies before his season was ended by an upper body injury on February 20, 2016.

==== Columbus Blue Jackets ====
On June 25, 2016, shortly after the conclusion of the 2016 NHL entry draft, Harrington was traded to the Columbus Blue Jackets (alongside a conditional fifth-round draft pick) in exchange for forward Kerby Rychel. The condition of the fifth-round pick would have been satisfied if Harrington was placed on waivers and claimed during the 2016–17 season, which did not occur. A restricted free agent in the offseason, he signed a one-year, two-way contract with Columbus in July. Harrington spent long periods as a healthy scratch from the lineup, as he would have to clear waivers in order to be assigned to the AHL and the Blue Jackets feared him being claimed by another team. In October, he was assigned to the Blue Jackets' AHL affiliate, the Cleveland Monsters, on a conditioning loan. As a result, he made his Columbus debut on November 15, when on short notice, he was added to the lineup in a 2–1 victory over the Washington Capitals. He played in only three of the team's first 42 games. He registered his first point for Columbus on January 21, 2017, assisting on Scott Hartnell's first period goal in a 3–2 win over the Carolina Hurricanes. He scored his first NHL goal and first for the team in the next game, a 7–6 overtime victory over the Ottawa Senators on January 22. On March 21, he signed a two-year contract extension with Columbus. In the end, he made 22 appearances for Columbus, marking the one goal and three points.

During the 2017–18 season, Harrington earned consistent playing time after Ryan Murray was injured, resulting in his playing 24 consecutive games, mainly on the team's third defence pairing. As a result, he also set new career highs in games played with 32 games, two goals and three assists for five points while also averaging 13:24 per game. Prior to the start of the 2018–19 season, Harrington suffered an upper body injury in a preseason game on September 28 and missed the Blue Jackets first two regular season games. Upon returning to the lineup, Harrington set new career highs in assists and points with two goals and 15 assists for 17 points in a career-high 73 games. He also helped the Blue Jackets advance past the first round of the postseason for the first time in franchise history by recording four assists through ten playoffs games.

In July 2019, Harrington signed a three-year contract with Columbus worth $4.9 million. He was a consistent healthy scratch during the 2019–20 season, sitting out 22 of 30 games by December. However, as a result of injuries to the Blue Jackets lineup, he suited up for 39 of the team's 70 regular-season games. Harrington finished the regular season with one goal and seven assists for eight points, before the NHL suspended play due to the COVID-19 pandemic on March 12, 2020. When play resumed in the pandemic-postponed 2020 Stanley Cup playoffs the Blue Jackets' lineup was mainly healthy. As a result, he made only one appearance in the postseason, going scoreless.

In the pandemic-shortened 2020–21 season, Harrington once again saw limited playing time, appearing in 12 games, tallying one goal and three points. He began the 2021–22 season with Columbus, but had seen such limited action and had been surpassed on the organizational depth chart. He was placed on waivers on December 7, 2021, and after going unclaimed, was assigned to Cleveland the next day to get playing time. However, by the end of the month he was back with Columbus, being recalled on December 31. After spending time on the team's taxi squad, he was returned to Cleveland on January 7, 2022. He made seven appearances for Columbus, registering one assist and played in 50 games for Cleveland, notching three goals and seven points.

==== San Jose Sharks ====
After six seasons within the Blue Jackets organization, Harrington left as a free agent and went un-signed over the summer. On September 9, 2022, Harrington agreed to join the training camp of the San Jose Sharks on a professional tryout (PTO). During the pre-season, Harrington successfully completed his tryout in earning a one-year, two-way contract with the Sharks on September 30. He began the 2022–23 season with the Sharks' debuting in their season opener on October 7, 2022. The Nashville Predators beat the Sharks 4–1 in the first game of the NHL Global Series that took place in Prague, Czechia. In mid-October, he was placed on waivers and after going unclaimed, was briefly assigned to the Sharks' AHL affiliate, the San Jose Barracuda. He was swiftly recalled and recorded his first point for the team on October 22 when he assisted on Kevin Labanc's goal in a 2–1 loss to the New Jersey Devils. He was placed on waivers a second time on November 17. After going unclaimed, he was assigned to the Barracuda. He was recalled again on November 27 and recorded his first goal with San Jose on December 9 in a 6–1 victory over the Anaheim Ducks. He played five games with the Barracuda, registering one assist. In 28 games with the Sharks, he had one goal and seven points.

==== Anaheim Ducks ====
On February 26, 2023, Harrington was traded to the New Jersey Devils in a multi-player trade, which centred around Timo Meier. However, Harrington was waived by New Jersey one day later, and was subsequently claimed by the Anaheim Ducks on February 28. He made his Ducks debut on March 1 in a 3–2 loss to the Washington Capitals. He recorded his first point with Anaheim on March 7, assisting on Trevor Zegras' first period goal in a 5–2 loss to the Seattle Kraken. He tallied his first two goals with the Ducks in the same game on March 17, in a 7–4 win over his former team, the Columbus Blue Jackets. He finished the season playing 17 games with the Ducks, scoring three goals and four points.

Remaining unsigned through the following summer, on August 23, 2023, the Ducks signed Harrington to a PTO contract. After attending training camp, Harrington was re-assigned to continue his tryout with the Ducks AHL affiliate, the San Diego Gulls. On October 13, he was signed by the Gulls to a PTO contract to open the 2023–24 season.

==== ZSC Lions ====
Before making an appearance with the Gulls, Harrington was released from his tryout on October 14, 2023, and then signed a one-year contract abroad with Swiss club, ZSC Lions of the National League (NL), on October 17. In his lone season with the Lions, Harrington was limited through a lower-body injury to just 14 regular season games. He returned for the playoffs, helping the club claim the Swiss championship with two assists through six appearances.

==== AHL ====
As a free agent, Harrington opted to return to North America and signed a one-year AHL contract with the St. Louis Blues primary AHL affiliate, the Springfield Thunderbirds, on July 12, 2024. He was given a PTO by the Blues, but was returned to Springfield ahead of the 2024–25 season. In 49 games with Springfield, he scored one goal and five points. The Thunderbirds qualified for the playoffs, but were knocked out the Providence Bruins in the first round. In three postseason games, he went scorless.

Once again a free agent, Harrington was invited to the Nashville Predators training camp on a PTO. However, he was released from his PTO on September 26, 2025. Harrington signed a two-year deal with the Belleville Senators of the AHL on October 10, 2025. He spent the entire season with Belleville, recording three goals and 19 points in 68 games. He was invited to the Ottawa Senators' 2026 training camp on a PTO. He was released from the PTO on September 27, 2026. A few months later, on November 6, Harrington was named captain of the Belleville Senators.

== International play ==
Medal record

Representing Canada

Ice hockey

World Junior Championships
Bronze medal – third place	2012 Canada	

World U-17 Hockey Challenge
Silver medal – second place	2010 Ontario	

Harrington was selected to join Team Ontario for the 2010 World U-17 Hockey Challenge. Team Ontario lost the final to Team USA, earning silver. Harrington was named to the tournament's all-star team. In 2011, he was selected to join Team Canada for the Ivan Hlinka Memorial Tournament, with whom he won a gold medal. He was named one of the team's alternate captains.

His international career continued the following season, when he was selected to play for Team Canada's junior team at the 2012 World Junior Championships. The team went on to win the bronze medal, beating Finland in the third-place game. He was one of six returning players the following year for the 2013 World Junior Championships where he was named one of the team's alternate captains. Canada finished fourth after they were beaten by Russia 6–5 in the bronze medal game.

== Career statistics ==
=== Regular season and playoffs ===
			Regular season					Playoffs
Season	Team	League	GP	G	A	Pts	PIM	GP	G	A	Pts	PIM
2008–09	Kingston Voyageurs	OJHL	2	0	1	1	2	18	1	6	7	6
2009–10	London Knights	OHL	55	1	13	14	20	12	0	2	2	4
2010–11	London Knights	OHL	67	6	16	22	51	6	0	1	1	0
2011–12	London Knights	OHL	44	3	23	26	32	19	1	6	7	6
2012–13	London Knights	OHL	50	3	16	19	26	17	0	4	4	14
2012–13	Wilkes-Barre/Scranton Penguins	AHL	—	—	—	—	—	2	1	0	1	0
2013–14	Wilkes-Barre/Scranton Penguins	AHL	76	5	19	24	55	16	0	1	1	12
2014–15	Wilkes-Barre/Scranton Penguins	AHL	48	2	10	12	20	8	0	1	1	0
2014–15	Pittsburgh Penguins	NHL	10	0	0	0	4	—	—	—	—	—
2015–16	Toronto Maple Leafs	NHL	15	0	1	1	4	—	—	—	—	—
2015–16	Toronto Marlies	AHL	17	1	2	3	14	—	—	—	—	—
2016–17	Cleveland Monsters	AHL	2	0	0	0	0	—	—	—	—	—
2016–17	Columbus Blue Jackets	NHL	22	1	2	3	10	3	0	0	0	10
2017–18	Columbus Blue Jackets	NHL	32	2	3	5	8	—	—	—	—	—
2018–19	Columbus Blue Jackets	NHL	73	2	15	17	23	10	0	4	4	2
2019–20	Columbus Blue Jackets	NHL	39	1	7	8	16	1	0	0	0	0
2020–21	Columbus Blue Jackets	NHL	12	1	2	3	6	—	—	—	—	—
2021–22	Columbus Blue Jackets	NHL	7	0	1	1	6	—	—	—	—	—
2021–22	Cleveland Monsters	AHL	50	3	4	7	15	—	—	—	—	—
2022–23	San Jose Sharks	NHL	28	1	6	7	8	—	—	—	—	—
2022–23	San Jose Barracuda	AHL	5	0	1	1	8	—	—	—	—	—
2022–23	Anaheim Ducks	NHL	17	3	1	4	2	—	—	—	—	—
2023–24	ZSC Lions	NL	14	0	4	4	2	6	0	2	2	2
2023–24	GCK Lions	SL	1	0	0	0	0	—	—	—	—	—
2024–25	Springfield Thunderbirds	AHL	49	1	4	5	21	3	0	0	0	2
2025–26	Belleville Senators	AHL	68	3	16	19	29	—	—	—	—	—
NHL totals			255	11	38	49	87	14	0	4	4	12

=== International ===
Year	Team	Event	Result	GP	G	A	Pts	PIM
2010	Canada Ontario	WHC17	2nd place, silver medalist(s)	6	0	3	3	0
2011	Canada	WJC18	4th	7	0	0	0	8
2011	Canada	HGC	1st place, gold medalist(s)	5	1	1	2	4
2012	Canada	WJC	3rd place, bronze medalist(s)	5	1	3	4	0
2013	Canada	WJC	4th	6	0	2	2	2
Junior totals				29	2	9	11	14

== Awards and honours ==
Awards	Year	Ref
OHL
First All-Rookie Team	2010	
First All-Star Team	2012, 2013	
J. Ross Robertson Cup champion	2012, 2013	
CHL Top Prospects Game	2011	
International
World U-17 Hockey Challenge silver medal	2010	
World U-17 Hockey Challenge All-Star Team	2010	
Ivan Hlinka Memorial Tournament gold medal	2011	
IIHF World U18 Championship bronze medal	2012	

== Bibliography ==
- Chaimovitch, Jason, ed. (2025). 2025–2026 American Hockey League Official Guide & Record Book. Springfield, Massachusetts: American Hockey League. OCLC 22147888.
