= 2018–19 NHL transactions =

The following is a list of all team-to-team transactions that have occurred in the National Hockey League (NHL) during the 2018–19 NHL season. It lists which team each player has been traded to, signed by, or claimed by, and for which player(s) or draft pick(s), if applicable. Players who have retired are also listed.The 2018–19 NHL trade deadline was on February 25, 2019. Players traded after this date were not eligible to play in the 2019 Stanley Cup playoffs.

== Retirement ==
Date	Player	Last Team	Ref
July 4, 2018	Jared Boll	Anaheim Ducks	
July 6, 2018	Alex Burrows	Ottawa Senators	
September 4, 2018	Chris Kelly	Anaheim Ducks	
September 5, 2018	Tom Sestito	Pittsburgh Penguins	
September 10, 2018	Kane Lafranchise	New York Islanders	
September 20, 2018	Ondrej Pavelec	New York Rangers	
September 24, 2018	Brian Gionta	Boston Bruins	
October 1, 2018	Scott Hartnell	Nashville Predators	
October 19, 2018	Jordin Tootoo	Chicago Blackhawks	
November 12, 2018	Luke Opilka	St. Louis Blues	
November 14, 2018	Paul Martin	San Jose Sharks	
January 11, 2019	Rick Nash	Boston Bruins	
January 14, 2019	Josh Gorges	Buffalo Sabres	
January 16, 2019	Brandon Bollig	Nashville Predators	
January 31, 2019	Antoine Vermette	Anaheim Ducks	
April 13, 2019	Peter Budaj	Los Angeles Kings	
June 4, 2019	Derek MacKenzie	Florida Panthers	
June 14, 2019	Michael Bournival	Tampa Bay Lightning	

== Contract terminations ==
A team and player may mutually agree to terminate a player's contract at any time. All players must clear waivers before having a contract terminated.

Buyouts can only occur at specific times of the year. For more details on contract terminations as buyouts:

Teams may buy out player contracts (after the conclusion of a season) for a portion of the remaining value of the contract, paid over a period of twice the remaining length of the contract. This reduced number and extended period is applied to the cap hit as well.

- If the player was under the age of 26 at the time of the buyout the player's pay and cap hit will reduced by a factor of 2/3 over the extended period.
- If the player was 26 or older at the time of the buyout the player's pay and cap hit will reduced by a factor of 1/3 over the extended period.
- If the player was 35 or older at the time of signing the contract the player's pay will be reduced by a factor of 1/3, but the cap hit will not be reduced over the extended period.

Injured players cannot be bought out.

Date	Name	Previous team	Notes	Ref
June 22, 2018	Eric Gryba	Edmonton Oilers	Buyout	
June 23, 2018	Paul Martin	San Jose Sharks	Buyout	
June 24, 2018	Brooks Orpik	Colorado Avalanche	Buyout	
June 25, 2018	Xavier Ouellet	Detroit Red Wings	Buyout	
June 27, 2018	Alex Burrows	Ottawa Senators	Buyout	
July 1, 2018	Tyler Ennis	Minnesota Wild	Buyout	
July 1, 2018	Steve Mason	Montreal Canadiens	Buyout	
July 5, 2018	Damir Sharipzyanov	Los Angeles Kings	Mutual termination	
July 18, 2018	Noah Rod	San Jose Sharks	Mutual termination	
August 3, 2018	Troy Brouwer	Calgary Flames	Buyout	
September 15, 2018	Jake Dotchin	Tampa Bay Lightning	Termination	
September 16, 2018	Dmitri Sergeev	St. Louis Blues	Mutual termination	
September 20, 2018	Vaclav Karabacek	Buffalo Sabres	Mutual termination	
September 22, 2018	Frederik Tiffels	Pittsburgh Penguins	Mutual termination	
September 25, 2018	Julius Nattinen	Anaheim Ducks	Mutual termination	
September 30, 2018	Anton Rodin	Anaheim Ducks	Mutual termination	
October 5, 2018	Jordan Maletta	Chicago Blackhawks	Mutual termination	
October 6, 2018	Simon Bourque	Winnipeg Jets	Mutual termination	
October 11, 2018	Jan Kovar	New York Islanders	Mutual termination	
October 20, 2018	Michael Fora	Carolina Hurricanes	Mutual termination	
November 2, 2018	Tyler Moy	Nashville Predators	Mutual termination	
November 3, 2018	Jeremiah Addison	Montreal Canadiens	Mutual termination	
November 5, 2018	Yasin Ehliz	Calgary Flames	Mutual termination	
November 8, 2018	Carl Persson	Nashville Predators	Mutual termination	
November 11, 2018	Tomas Plekanec	Montreal Canadiens	Mutual termination	
November 14, 2018	Dennis Everberg	Winnipeg Jets	Mutual termination	
November 14, 2018	Michael Lindqvist	New York Rangers	Mutual termination	
November 16, 2018	Filip Sandberg	San Jose Sharks	Mutual termination	
November 28, 2018	Eric Martinsson	Minnesota Wild	Mutual termination	
December 7, 2018	Sergei Shumakov	Washington Capitals	Mutual termination	
December 11, 2018	Martin Bakos	Boston Bruins	Mutual termination	
December 20, 2018	Patrik Berglund	Buffalo Sabres	Mutual termination	
December 20, 2018	Radel Fazleev	Philadelphia Flyers	Mutual termination	
December 29, 2018	Michal Cajkovsky	Carolina Hurricanes	Mutual termination	
December 29, 2018	Joonas Lyytinen	Nashville Predators	Mutual termination	
January 3, 2019	Jason Garrison	Chicago Blackhawks	Mutual termination	
January 5, 2019	Vince Pedrie	New York Rangers	Mutual termination	
January 9, 2019	Miroslav Svoboda	Nashville Predators	Mutual termination	
January 19, 2019	Brian Flynn	St. Louis Blues	Mutual termination	
January 29, 2019	Michal Moravcik	Montreal Canadiens	Mutual termination	
February 11, 2019	Luc Snuggerud	Chicago Blackhawks	Mutual termination	
April 17, 2019	Jesse Gabrielle	Boston Bruins	Mutual termination	
May 15, 2019	Yannick Rathgeb	New York Islanders	Mutual termination	
May 18, 2019	Jens Looke	Arizona Coyotes	Mutual termination	
May 18, 2019	Juuso Ikonen	Washington Capitals	Mutual termination	
May 25, 2019	Jonne Tammela	Tampa Bay Lightning	Mutual termination	
May 25, 2019	Filip Pyrochta	Nashville Predators	Mutual termination	
June 15, 2019	Dion Phaneuf	Los Angeles Kings	Buyout	
June 16, 2019	Andrew MacDonald	Philadelphia Flyers	Buyout	
June 19, 2019	Corey Perry	Anaheim Ducks	Buyout	

== Free agency ==
Date	Player	New team	Previous team	Ref
July 1, 2018	Blake Comeau	Dallas Stars	Colorado Avalanche	
July 1, 2018	Ian Cole	Colorado Avalanche	Columbus Blue Jackets	
July 1, 2018	Jack Johnson	Pittsburgh Penguins	Columbus Blue Jackets	
July 1, 2018	Chris Kunitz	Chicago Blackhawks	Tampa Bay Lightning	
July 1, 2018	Cam Ward	Chicago Blackhawks	Carolina Hurricanes	
July 1, 2018	Brandon Manning	Chicago Blackhawks	Philadelphia Flyers	
July 1, 2018	Jaroslav Halak	Boston Bruins	New York Islanders	
July 1, 2018	Joakim Nordstrom	Boston Bruins	Carolina Hurricanes	
July 1, 2018	James van Riemsdyk	Philadelphia Flyers	Toronto Maple Leafs	
July 1, 2018	Thomas Vanek	Detroit Red Wings	Columbus Blue Jackets	
July 1, 2018	Jonathan Bernier	Detroit Red Wings	Colorado Avalanche	
July 1, 2018	Tim Schaller	Vancouver Canucks	Boston Bruins	
July 1, 2018	Xavier Ouellet	Montreal Canadiens	Detroit Red Wings	
July 1, 2018	Eric Gryba	New Jersey Devils	Edmonton Oilers	
July 1, 2018	Josh Jooris	Toronto Maple Leafs	Pittsburgh Penguins	
July 1, 2018	Michael Grabner	Arizona Coyotes	New Jersey Devils	
July 1, 2018	Tomas Plekanec	Montreal Canadiens	Toronto Maple Leafs	
July 1, 2018	Matthew Peca	Montreal Canadiens	Tampa Bay Lightning	
July 1, 2018	Nick Holden	Vegas Golden Knights	Boston Bruins	
July 1, 2018	Petr Mrazek	Carolina Hurricanes	Philadelphia Flyers	
July 1, 2018	Kyle Brodziak	Edmonton Oilers	St. Louis Blues	
July 1, 2018	Kevin Gravel	Edmonton Oilers	Los Angeles Kings	
July 1, 2018	Derek Ryan	Calgary Flames	Carolina Hurricanes	
July 1, 2018	Tyler Bozak	St. Louis Blues	Toronto Maple Leafs	
July 1, 2018	Paul Stastny	Vegas Golden Knights	Winnipeg Jets	
July 1, 2018	Zachary Fucale	Vegas Golden Knights	Montreal Canadiens	
July 1, 2018	Kenny Agostino	Montreal Canadiens	Boston Bruins	
July 1, 2018	Jay Beagle	Vancouver Canucks	Washington Capitals	
July 1, 2018	Nic Dowd	Washington Capitals	Vancouver Canucks	
July 1, 2018	Mike Liambas	Minnesota Wild	Anaheim Ducks	
July 1, 2018	Roman Polak	Dallas Stars	Toronto Maple Leafs	
July 1, 2018	Michael Chaput	Montreal Canadiens	Chicago Blackhawks	
July 1, 2018	David Perron	St. Louis Blues	Vegas Golden Knights	
July 1, 2018	Matt Hendricks	Minnesota Wild	Winnipeg Jets	
July 1, 2018	John Tavares	Toronto Maple Leafs	New York Islanders	
July 1, 2018	Anton Khudobin	Dallas Stars	Boston Bruins	
July 1, 2018	Antoine Roussel	Vancouver Canucks	Dallas Stars	
July 1, 2018	Chad Johnson	St. Louis Blues	Buffalo Sabres	
July 1, 2018	John Moore	Boston Bruins	New Jersey Devils	
July 1, 2018	Greg Pateryn	Minnesota Wild	Dallas Stars	
July 1, 2018	Carter Hutton	Buffalo Sabres	St. Louis Blues	
July 1, 2018	Matt Cullen	Pittsburgh Penguins	Minnesota Wild	
July 1, 2018	Scott Wedgewood	Buffalo Sabres	Los Angeles Kings	
July 1, 2018	Michael Hutchinson	Florida Panthers	Winnipeg Jets	
July 1, 2018	Austin Czarnik	Calgary Flames	Boston Bruins	
July 1, 2018	J.T. Brown	Minnesota Wild	Anaheim Ducks	
July 1, 2018	Wade Megan	Detroit Red Wings	St. Louis Blues	
July 1, 2018	Jake Chelios	Detroit Red Wings	Carolina Hurricanes	
July 1, 2018	Harri Sateri	Detroit Red Wings	Florida Panthers	
July 1, 2018	Chris Terry	Detroit Red Wings	Montreal Canadiens	
July 1, 2018	Tommy Cross	Columbus Blue Jackets	Boston Bruins	
July 1, 2018	Adam Clendening	Columbus Blue Jackets	Chicago Blackhawks	
July 1, 2018	Michael Mersch	Dallas Stars	Los Angeles Kings	
July 1, 2018	Matt Calvert	Colorado Avalanche	Columbus Blue Jackets	
July 1, 2018	Matt Bartkowski	Minnesota Wild	Calgary Flames	
July 1, 2018	Andrew Hammond	Minnesota Wild	Colorado Avalanche	
July 1, 2018	Eric Fehr	Minnesota Wild	San Jose Sharks	
July 1, 2018	Tobias Rieder	Edmonton Oilers	Los Angeles Kings	
July 1, 2018	Daniel Carr	Vegas Golden Knights	Montreal Canadiens	
July 1, 2018	Laurent Brossoit	Winnipeg Jets	Edmonton Oilers	
July 1, 2018	Fredrik Claesson	New York Rangers	Ottawa Senators	
July 1, 2018	Tyler Wotherspoon	St. Louis Blues	Calgary Flames	
July 1, 2018	Erik Condra	Dallas Stars	Tampa Bay Lightning	
July 1, 2018	Brian Flynn	St. Louis Blues	Dallas Stars	
July 1, 2018	Mike McKenna	Ottawa Senators	Dallas Stars	
July 1, 2018	Dillon Simpson	Columbus Blue Jackets	Edmonton Oilers	
July 1, 2018	Riley Nash	Columbus Blue Jackets	Boston Bruins	
July 1, 2018	Adam Cracknell	Toronto Maple Leafs	Montreal Canadiens	
July 1, 2018	Jordan Subban	Toronto Maple Leafs	Los Angeles Kings	
July 1, 2018	Jimmy Hayes	Pittsburgh Penguins	New Jersey Devils	
July 1, 2018	John Muse	Pittsburgh Penguins	Philadelphia Flyers	
July 1, 2018	Leo Komarov	New York Islanders	Toronto Maple Leafs	
July 1, 2018	Chris Wagner	Boston Bruins	New York Islanders	
July 1, 2018	Cody Goloubef	Boston Bruins	Calgary Flames	
July 1, 2018	Mark McNeill	Boston Bruins	Nashville Predators	
July 1, 2018	Paul Carey	Ottawa Senators	New York Rangers	
July 1, 2018	Cameron Gaunce	Tampa Bay Lightning	Columbus Blue Jackets	
July 1, 2018	Jayson Megna	Washington Capitals	Vancouver Canucks	
July 1, 2018	Michael Sgarbossa	Washington Capitals	Winnipeg Jets	
July 1, 2018	Joel Hanley	Dallas Stars	Arizona Coyotes	
July 1, 2018	Alex Gallant	Vegas Golden Knights	Tampa Bay Lightning	
July 1, 2018	Curtis McKenzie	Vegas Golden Knights	Dallas Stars	
July 1, 2018	Seth Griffith	Winnipeg Jets	Buffalo Sabres	
July 1, 2018	Alan Quine	Calgary Flames	New York Islanders	
July 1, 2018	Connor Brickley	Nashville Predators	Florida Panthers	
July 1, 2018	Rocco Grimaldi	Nashville Predators	Colorado Avalanche	
July 1, 2018	John Ramage	New Jersey Devils	Nashville Predators	
July 1, 2018	Jarred Tinordi	Nashville Predators	Pittsburgh Penguins	
July 1, 2018	Tyler Graovac	Calgary Flames	Washington Capitals	
July 1, 2018	Luke Schenn	Anaheim Ducks	Arizona Coyotes	
July 1, 2018	Jared Coreau	Anaheim Ducks	Detroit Red Wings	
July 1, 2018	Kurtis Gabriel	New Jersey Devils	Minnesota Wild	
July 1, 2018	Valtteri Filppula	New York Islanders	Philadelphia Flyers	
July 1, 2018	Joey LaLeggia	St. Louis Blues	Edmonton Oilers	
July 2, 2018	Matt Lorito	New York Islanders	Detroit Red Wings	
July 2, 2018	James Neal	Calgary Flames	Vegas Golden Knights	
July 2, 2018	Zac Rinaldo	Nashville Predators	Arizona Coyotes	
July 2, 2018	Dan Renouf	Carolina Hurricanes	Detroit Red Wings	
July 2, 2018	Paul Thompson	Florida Panthers	Vegas Golden Knights	
July 2, 2018	Buddy Robinson	Calgary Flames	Winnipeg Jets	
July 2, 2018	Brian Gibbons	Anaheim Ducks	New Jersey Devils	
July 2, 2018	Carter Rowney	Anaheim Ducks	Pittsburgh Penguins	
July 2, 2018	Ben Street	Anaheim Ducks	Detroit Red Wings	
July 2, 2018	Tom Kuhnhackl	New York Islanders	Pittsburgh Penguins	
July 2, 2018	Mike Sislo	New York Islanders	Buffalo Sabres	
July 3, 2018	Robin Lehner	New York Islanders	Buffalo Sabres	
July 3, 2018	Calvin de Haan	Carolina Hurricanes	New York Islanders	
July 5, 2018	Jordan Nolan	St. Louis Blues	Buffalo Sabres	
July 5, 2018	Christian Folin	Philadelphia Flyers	Los Angeles Kings	
July 5, 2018	Andrej Sustr	Anaheim Ducks	Tampa Bay Lightning	
July 5, 2018	Anthony Duclair	Columbus Blue Jackets	Chicago Blackhawks	
July 6, 2018	Tyler Ennis	Toronto Maple Leafs	Minnesota Wild	
July 10, 2018	Patrick Maroon	St. Louis Blues	New Jersey Devils	
July 13, 2018	Julian Melchiori	Florida Panthers	Winnipeg Jets	
July 14, 2018	Zack Mitchell	Los Angeles Kings	Minnesota Wild	
July 19, 2018	Derek Grant	Pittsburgh Penguins	Anaheim Ducks	
July 24, 2018	Brooks Orpik	Washington Capitals	Colorado Avalanche	
July 25, 2018	Adam Tambellini	Ottawa Senators	New York Rangers	
July 25, 2018	Dan Hamhuis	Nashville Predators	Dallas Stars	
July 25, 2018	Eric Tangradi	New Jersey Devils	Detroit Red Wings	
July 30, 2018	Matt Read	Minnesota Wild	Philadelphia Flyers	
August 10, 2018	Chase Balisy	Ottawa Senators	Florida Panthers	
August 20, 2018	Dustin Tokarski	New York Rangers	Philadelphia Flyers	
August 20, 2018	Jakub Jerabek	Edmonton Oilers	Washington Capitals	
August 21, 2018	Anthony Peluso	Calgary Flames	Washington Capitals	
August 27, 2018	Troy Brouwer	Florida Panthers	Calgary Flames	
September 24, 2018	Luca Sbisa	New York Islanders	Vegas Golden Knights	
September 27, 2018	Brandon Davidson	Chicago Blackhawks	New York Islanders	
October 2, 2018	Alex Chiasson	Edmonton Oilers	Washington Capitals	
October 2, 2018	Jason Garrison	Edmonton Oilers	Vegas Golden Knights	
October 17, 2018	Jake Dotchin	Anaheim Ducks	Tampa Bay Lightning	
October 30, 2018	Brandon Hagel	Chicago Blackhawks	Buffalo Sabres	
November 30, 2018	Justin Falk	Ottawa Senators	Buffalo Sabres	
February 19, 2019	Michael Leighton	Vancouver Canucks	Pittsburgh Penguins	
February 24, 2019	Lee Stempniak	Boston Bruins	Carolina Hurricanes	

=== Imports ===
This section is for players who were not previously on contract with NHL teams in the past season. Listed is their previous team and the league that they belonged to.

Date	Player	New team	Previous team	League	Ref
July 1, 2018	Mikko Koskinen	Edmonton Oilers	SKA Saint Petersburg	KHL	
July 1, 2018	Antti Suomela	San Jose Sharks	JYP Jyvaskyla	Liiga	
July 1, 2018	Yasin Ehliz	Calgary Flames	Thomas Sabo Ice Tigers	DEL	
July 1, 2018	Marcus Hogstrom	Calgary Flames	Djurgardens IF	SHL	
July 1, 2018	Brooks Macek	Vegas Golden Knights	EHC Red Bull Munchen	DEL	
July 1, 2018	Martin Bakos	Boston Bruins	HC Bili Tygri Liberec	ELH	
July 1, 2018	Michael Fora	Carolina Hurricanes	HC Ambri-Piotta	NL	
July 1, 2018	Ilya Kovalchuk	Los Angeles Kings	SKA Saint Petersburg	KHL	
July 1, 2018	Anton Rodin	Anaheim Ducks	HC Davos	NL	
July 1, 2018	Stefan Elliott	Pittsburgh Penguins	HV71	SHL	
July 1, 2018	Jimmy Oligny	Vegas Golden Knights	Milwaukee Admirals	AHL	
July 1, 2018	Dennis Everberg	Winnipeg Jets	HC Neftekhimik Nizhnekamsk	KHL	
July 1, 2018	Joel L'Esperance	Dallas Stars	Michigan Tech Huskies	NCAA	
July 2, 2018	Jacob MacDonald	Florida Panthers	Binghamton Devils	AHL	
July 2, 2018	Scott Kosmachuk	Colorado Avalanche	Hartford Wolf Pack	AHL	
July 2, 2018	Sheldon Dries	Colorado Avalanche	Texas Stars	AHL	
July 2, 2018	Sean Walker	Los Angeles Kings	Ontario Reign	AHL	
July 3, 2018	Colin Blackwell	Nashville Predators	Rochester Americans	AHL	
July 3, 2018	Zach Magwood	Nashville Predators	Barrie Colts	OHL	
July 6, 2018	Vladislav Kotkov	San Jose Sharks	Chicoutimi Sagueneens	QMJHL	
July 9, 2018	Jan Kovar	New York Islanders	Metallurg Magnitogorsk	KHL	
July 18, 2018	Alexander True	San Jose Sharks	San Jose Barracuda	AHL	
July 18, 2018	Josh Currie	Edmonton Oilers	Bakersfield Condors	AHL	
July 23, 2018	Logan O'Connor	Colorado Avalanche	Denver Pioneers	NCAA	
September 1, 2018	Sergei Shumakov	Washington Capitals	HC CSKA Moscow	KHL	
September 13, 2018	Ben Gleason	Dallas Stars	Hamilton Bulldogs	OHL	
September 20, 2018	Yegor Zamula	Philadelphia Flyers	Calgary Hitmen	WHL	
September 21, 2018	Joel Teasdale	Montreal Canadiens	Blainville-Boisbriand Armada	QMJHL	
September 24, 2018	Jeremy Groleau	New Jersey Devils	Chicoutimi Sagueneens	QMJHL	
September 25, 2018	Ryan Haggerty	Pittsburgh Penguins	Wilkes-Barre/Scranton Penguins	AHL	
September 27, 2018	Michal Cajkovsky	Carolina Hurricanes	Avtomobilist Yekaterinburg	KHL	
September 27, 2018	Michael Prapavessis	Columbus Blue Jackets	Cleveland Monsters	AHL	
November 2, 2018	Colton Beck	Minnesota Wild	Iowa Wild	AHL	
November 4, 2018	Matt Donovan	Nashville Predators	Milwaukee Admirals	AHL	
November 11, 2018	Logan Shaw	Winnipeg Jets	San Diego Gulls	AHL	
December 14, 2018	Mitch Eliot	Vancouver Canucks	Sarnia Sting	OHL	
February 5, 2019	Turner Elson	Detroit Red Wings	Grand Rapids Griffins	AHL	
February 19, 2019	Tom McCollum	Nashville Predators	Milwaukee Admirals	AHL	
February 20, 2019	Joseph Cramarossa	Pittsburgh Penguins	Wilkes-Barre/Scranton Penguins	AHL	
February 24, 2019	Jeremy Smith	New York Islanders	Bridgeport Sound Tigers	AHL	
February 24, 2019	Chris Driedger	Florida Panthers	Springfield Thunderbirds	AHL	
February 24, 2019	Adam Wilcox	Buffalo Sabres	Rochester Americans	AHL	
February 24, 2019	Evan Cormier	New Jersey Devils	Binghamton Devils	AHL	
February 24, 2019	Parker Milner	Washington Capitals	Hershey Bears	AHL	
February 25, 2019	Ken Appleby	Winnipeg Jets	Manitoba Moose	AHL	
March 1, 2019	Jimmy Huntington	Tampa Bay Lightning	Rimouski Oceanic	QMJHL	
March 1, 2019	Tye Felhaber	Dallas Stars	Ottawa 67's	OHL	
March 4, 2019	Simon Benoit	Anaheim Ducks	San Diego Gulls	AHL	
March 6, 2019	Reese Johnson	Chicago Blackhawks	Red Deer Rebels	WHL	
March 11, 2019	Jake Lucchini	Pittsburgh Penguins	Michigan Tech Huskies	NCAA	
March 12, 2019	Max Veronneau	Ottawa Senators	Princeton Tigers	NCAA	
March 12, 2019	Ryan Kuffner	Detroit Red Wings	Princeton Tigers	NCAA	
March 12, 2019	Josh Teves	Vancouver Canucks	Princeton Tigers	NCAA	
March 12, 2019	Taro Hirose	Detroit Red Wings	Michigan State Spartans	NCAA	
March 13, 2019	Joseph Duszak	Toronto Maple Leafs	Mercyhurst Lakers	NCAA	
March 15, 2019	Jacob Elmer	New York Rangers	Lethbridge Hurricanes	WHL	
March 18, 2019	Joe Snively	Washington Capitals	Yale Bulldogs	NCAA	
March 18, 2019	Mat Robson	Minnesota Wild	Minnesota Golden Gophers	NCAA	
March 18, 2019	Brady Keeper	Florida Panthers	Maine Black Bears	NCAA	
March 19, 2019	Josh Melnick	Dallas Stars	Miami RedHawks	NCAA	
March 19, 2019	Luke Philp	Calgary Flames	Alberta Golden Bears	U Sports	
March 21, 2019	Grant Hutton	New York Islanders	Miami RedHawks	NCAA	
March 26, 2019	Bobo Carpenter	New York Islanders	Boston University Terriers	NCAA	
March 30, 2019	Patrick Newell	New York Rangers	St. Cloud State Huskies	NCAA	
March 30, 2019	Artyom Zagidulin	Calgary Flames	Metallurg Magnitogorsk	KHL	
April 1, 2019	Nico Sturm	Minnesota Wild	Clarkson Golden Knights	NCAA	
April 1, 2019	Jake Kielly	Vancouver Canucks	Clarkson Golden Knights	NCAA	
April 1, 2019	Brogan Rafferty	Vancouver Canucks	Quinnipiac Bobcats	NCAA	
April 2, 2019	Mason Jobst	New York Islanders	Ohio State Buckeyes	NCAA	
April 2, 2019	Blake Lizotte	Los Angeles Kings	St. Cloud State Huskies	NCAA	
April 3, 2019	Andrew Shortridge	San Jose Sharks	Quinnipiac Bobcats	NCAA	
April 3, 2019	Jimmy Schuldt	Vegas Golden Knights	St. Cloud State Huskies	NCAA	
April 5, 2019	Bobby Nardella	Washington Capitals	Notre Dame Fighting Irish	NCAA	
April 5, 2019	Lukas Craggs	Nashville Predators	Bowling Green Falcons	NCAA	
April 5, 2019	Brandon Fortunato	Nashville Predators	Quinnipiac Bobcats	NCAA	
April 17, 2019	Jacob Pritchard	Carolina Hurricanes	UMass Minutemen	NCAA	
April 18, 2019	Josh Wilkins	Nashville Predators	Providence Friars	NCAA	
April 22, 2019	Oula Palve	Pittsburgh Penguins	HC TPS	Liiga	
April 25, 2019	Joel Kellman	San Jose Sharks	Brynas IF	SHL	
April 25, 2019	Danil Yurtaikin	San Jose Sharks	Lokomotiv Yaroslavl	KHL	
April 29, 2019	Emil Djuse	Dallas Stars	Skelleftea AIK	SHL	
May 1, 2019	Mathieu Olivier	Nashville Predators	Milwaukee Admirals	AHL	
May 6, 2019	Ilya Mikheyev	Toronto Maple Leafs	Avangard Omsk	KHL	
May 7, 2019	Otto Leskinen	Montreal Canadiens	KalPa	Liiga	
May 7, 2019	Teemu Kivihalme	Toronto Maple Leafs	Oulun Karpat	Liiga	
May 7, 2019	Carl-Johan Lerby	Calgary Flames	Malmo Redhawks	SHL	
May 8, 2019	Arttu Ruotsalainen	Buffalo Sabres	Ilves	Liiga	
May 9, 2019	Tony Sund	San Jose Sharks	Vaasan Sport	Liiga	
May 10, 2019	Olle Alsing	Ottawa Senators	Djurgardens IF	SHL	
May 10, 2019	Gerald Mayhew	Minnesota Wild	Iowa Wild	AHL	
May 10, 2019	Alexander Yelesin	Calgary Flames	Lokomotiv Yaroslavl	KHL	
May 21, 2019	Logan Day	Edmonton Oilers	Bakersfield Condors	AHL	
May 23, 2019	Anton Wedin	Chicago Blackhawks	Timra IK	SHL	
May 24, 2019	Alex Belzile	Montreal Canadiens	Laval Rocket	AHL	
May 24, 2019	Joakim Nygard	Edmonton Oilers	Farjestad BK	SHL	
May 28, 2019	Rodrigo Abols	Florida Panthers	Orebro HK	SHL	
May 28, 2019	Oliwer Kaski	Detroit Red Wings	Lahti Pelicans	Liiga	
May 28, 2019	Lean Bergmann	San Jose Sharks	Iserlohn Roosters	DEL	
May 29, 2019	Jeffrey Truchon-Viel	San Jose Sharks	San Jose Barracuda	AHL	
May 31, 2019	Joel Kiviranta	Dallas Stars	Vaasan Sport	Liiga	
June 1, 2019	Andrei Chibisov	Winnipeg Jets	Metallurg Magnitogorsk	KHL	
June 1, 2019	Emil Larmi	Pittsburgh Penguins	HPK	Liiga	

== Trades ==
* Retained Salary Transaction: Each team is allowed up to three contracts on their payroll where they have retained salary in a trade (i.e. the player no longer plays with Team A due to a trade to Team B, but Team A still retains some salary). Only up to 50% of a player's contract can be kept, and only up to 15% of a team's salary cap can be taken up by retained salary. A contract can only be involved in one of these trades twice.

Hover over retained salary or conditional transactions for more information.

=== June ===
June 22, 2018	To Colorado Avalanche Philipp Grubauer; Brooks Orpik	To Washington Capitals 2nd-round pick in 2018
June 23, 2018	To Calgary Flames Noah Hanifin; Elias Lindholm	To Carolina Hurricanes Dougie Hamilton; Micheal Ferland; Adam Fox
June 23, 2018	To Edmonton Oilers Hayden Hawkey	To Montreal Canadiens 5th-round pick in 2019
June 24, 2018	To Chicago Blackhawks Michael Chaput	To Vancouver Canucks Tanner Kero
June 24, 2018	To Arizona Coyotes Robbie Russo	To Detroit Red Wings conditional 7th-round pick in 2019
June 27, 2018	To Buffalo Sabres Conor Sheary; Matt Hunwick	To Pittsburgh Penguins conditional 3rd-round pick in 2019 or 4th-round pick in 2019
June 27, 2018	To Chicago Blackhawks Jordan Schroeder	To Columbus Blue Jackets Jean-Francois Berube
June 30, 2018	To Montreal Canadiens Joel Armia; Steve Mason; 7th-round pick in 2019; 4th-round pick in 2020	To Winnipeg Jets Simon Bourque
June 30, 2018	To Winnipeg Jets Nic Kerdiles	To Anaheim Ducks Chase De Leo

Pick-only 2018 NHL entry draft trades
June 22, 2018	To New York Rangers PIT 1st-round pick in 2018 (#22 overall)	To Ottawa Senators BOS 1st-round pick in 2018 (#26 overall); NJD 2nd-round pick in 2018 (#48 overall)
June 22, 2018	To St. Louis Blues 1st-round pick in 2018 (#25 overall)	To Toronto Maple Leafs WPG 1st-round pick in 2018 (#29 overall); 3rd-round pick in 2018 (#76 overall)
June 23, 2018	To Pittsburgh Penguins NSH 2nd-round pick in 2018 (#58 overall)	To Colorado Avalanche OTT 3rd-round pick in 2018 (#64 overall); 5th-round pick in 2018 (#146 overall)
June 23, 2018	To Edmonton Oilers WSH 2nd-round pick in 2018 (#62 overall)	To Montreal Canadiens 3rd-round pick in 2018 (#71 overall); 5th-round pick in 2018 (#133 overall)
June 23, 2018	To Chicago Blackhawks CGY 3rd-round pick in 2018 (#74 overall)	To Arizona Coyotes TOR 3rd-round pick in 2018 (#87 overall); CBJ 5th-round pick in 2018 (#142 overall)
June 23, 2018	To San Jose Sharks TOR 3rd-round pick in 2018 (#87 overall)	To Arizona Coyotes 4th-round pick in 2018 (#114 overall); 5th-round pick in 2018 (#145 overall)
June 23, 2018	To Florida Panthers 3rd-round pick in 2018 (#89 overall)	To Nashville Predators 3rd-round pick in 2019
June 23, 2018	To San Jose Sharks EDM 4th-round pick in 2018 (#102 overall)	To Montreal Canadiens VGK 4th-round pick in 2018 (#123 overall); FLA 5th-round pick in 2018 (#139 overall)
June 23, 2018	To Calgary Flames WPG 4th-round pick in 2018 (#122 overall)	To Montreal Canadiens 4th-round pick in 2019
June 23, 2018	To Chicago Blackhawks FLA 5th-round pick in 2018 (#139 overall)	To Montreal Canadiens 5th-round pick in 2019
June 23, 2018	To Toronto Maple Leafs 6th-round pick in 2018 (#156 overall)	To Buffalo Sabres 6th-round pick in 2019
June 23, 2018	To Columbus Blue Jackets MTL 6th-round pick in 2018 (#159 overall)	To Detroit Red Wings 5th-round pick in 2019
June 23, 2018	To Washington Capitals 6th-round pick in 2018 (#161 overall)	To Vancouver Canucks 6th-round pick in 2018 (#186 overall); 6th-round pick in 2019
June 23, 2018	To Montreal Canadiens MTL 7th-round pick in 2018 (#190 overall)	To Philadelphia Flyers 7th-round pick in 2019
June 23, 2018	To Vegas Golden Knights 7th-round pick in 2018 (#208 overall)	To Pittsburgh Penguins 7th-round pick in 2019
June 23, 2018	To New York Rangers VGK 7th-round pick in 2018 (#216 overall)	To Carolina Hurricanes BOS 7th-round pick in 2019

=== July ===
July 1, 2018	To St. Louis Blues Ryan O'Reilly	To Buffalo Sabres Patrik Berglund; Vladimir Sobotka; Tage Thompson conditional 1st-round pick in 2019 or 1st-round pick in 2020; 2nd-round pick in 2021
July 3, 2018	To New York Islanders Matt Martin	To Toronto Maple Leafs Eamon McAdam
July 12, 2018	To Arizona Coyotes Marian Hossa; Vinnie Hinostroza; Jordan Oesterle; 3rd-round pick in 2019	To Chicago Blackhawks Marcus Kruger; Andrew Campbell; MacKenzie Entwistle; Jordan Maletta; 5th-round pick in 2019
July 18, 2018	To Columbus Blue Jackets Ryan MacInnis	To Arizona Coyotes Jacob Graves conditional 6th-round pick in 2019 or 5th-round pick in 2020

=== August ===
August 2, 2018	To Buffalo Sabres Jeff Skinner	To Carolina Hurricanes Cliff Pu; 2nd-round pick in 2019; 3rd-round pick in 2020; 6th-round pick in 2020
August 20, 2018	To Calgary Flames Kerby Rychel	To Montreal Canadiens Hunter Shinkaruk

=== September ===
September 9, 2018	To Vegas Golden Knights Max Pacioretty*	To Montreal Canadiens Tomas Tatar*; Nick Suzuki; CBJ 2nd-round pick in 2019
September 11, 2018	To New York Rangers Adam McQuaid	To Boston Bruins Steven Kampfer; 4th-round pick in 2019 conditional 7th-round pick in 2019
September 13, 2018	To San Jose Sharks Erik Karlsson; Francis Perron	To Ottawa Senators Chris Tierney; Dylan DeMelo; Josh Norris; Rudolfs Balcers conditional 1st-round pick in 2019 or 1st-round pick in 2020 conditional FLA 2nd-round pick in 2019 or SJS 2nd-round pick in 2019 conditional 1st-round pick in 2021 or 2nd-round pick in 2021 conditional 1st-round pick

=== October ===
October 1, 2018	To St. Louis Blues Jakub Jerabek	To Edmonton Oilers conditional 5th-round pick in 2020 or 6th-round pick in 2020
October 1, 2018	To Dallas Stars Connor Carrick	To Toronto Maple Leafs conditional 6th-round pick in 2019 or 7th-round pick in 2019
October 1, 2018	To Montreal Canadiens Brett Kulak	To Calgary Flames Rinat Valiev; Matt Taormina
October 1, 2018	To Nashville Predators Nicholas Baptiste	To Buffalo Sabres Jack Dougherty
October 3, 2018	To Montreal Canadiens Gustav Olofsson	To Minnesota Wild William Bitten
October 18, 2018	To Tampa Bay Lightning Mitch Hults	To Anaheim Ducks future considerations

=== November ===
November 10, 2018	To Dallas Stars Taylor Fedun	To Buffalo Sabres conditional 7th-round pick in 2020
November 14, 2018	To Los Angeles Kings Carl Hagelin*	To Pittsburgh Penguins Tanner Pearson
November 16, 2018	To New York Rangers Ryan Strome	To Edmonton Oilers Ryan Spooner*
November 21, 2018	To Los Angeles Kings Pavel Jenys	To Minnesota Wild Stepan Falkovsky
November 22, 2018	To Edmonton Oilers Chris Wideman	To Ottawa Senators conditional STL 5th-round pick in 2020 or STL 6th-round pick in 2020
November 25, 2018	To Chicago Blackhawks Dylan Strome; Brendan Perlini	To Arizona Coyotes Nick Schmaltz
November 27, 2018	To Toronto Maple Leafs Morgan Klimchuk	To Calgary Flames Andrew Nielsen

=== December ===
December 3, 2018	To Vancouver Canucks Josh Leivo	To Toronto Maple Leafs Michael Carcone
December 3, 2018	To Anaheim Ducks Daniel Sprong	To Pittsburgh Penguins Marcus Pettersson
December 5, 2018	To Ottawa Senators Stefan Elliott; Tobias Lindberg	To Pittsburgh Penguins Ben Sexton; Macoy Erkamps
December 10, 2018	To Anaheim Ducks Adam Cracknell	To Toronto Maple Leafs Steven Oleksy
December 28, 2018	To Anaheim Ducks Trevor Murphy	To Arizona Coyotes Giovanni Fiore
December 29, 2018	To Toronto Maple Leafs Michael Hutchinson	To Florida Panthers 5th-round pick in 2020
December 30, 2018	To Edmonton Oilers Alex Petrovic	To Florida Panthers Chris Wideman conditional EDM 3rd-round pick in 2019 or NYI 3rd-round pick in 2019
December 30, 2018	To Chicago Blackhawks Drake Caggiula; Jason Garrison	To Edmonton Oilers Brandon Manning; Robin Norell

=== January ===
January 2, 2019	To Ottawa Senators Anders Nilsson; Darren Archibald	To Vancouver Canucks Mike McKenna; Tom Pyatt; 6th-round pick 2019
January 3, 2019	To St. Louis Blues Jared Coreau	To Anaheim Ducks future considerations
January 3, 2019	To Winnipeg Jets Jimmy Oligny	To Vegas Golden Knights future considerations
January 11, 2019	To Ottawa Senators Morgan Klimchuk	To Toronto Maple Leafs Gabriel Gagne
January 11, 2019	To Ottawa Senators Cody Goloubef	To Boston Bruins Paul Carey
January 11, 2019	To Arizona Coyotes Jordan Weal	To Philadelphia Flyers Jacob Graves; 6th-round pick 2019
January 11, 2019	To Chicago Blackhawks Slater Koekkoek; 5th-round pick 2019	To Tampa Bay Lightning Jan Rutta; 7th-round pick 2019
January 14, 2019	To Dallas Stars Andrew Cogliano	To Anaheim Ducks Devin Shore
January 14, 2019	To New York Rangers Connor Brickley	To Nashville Predators Cole Schneider
January 16, 2019	To Minnesota Wild Pontus Aberg	To Anaheim Ducks Justin Kloos
January 17, 2019	To Anaheim Ducks Michael Del Zotto*	To Vancouver Canucks Luke Schenn; 7th-round pick 2020
January 17, 2019	To Anaheim Ducks Derek Grant	To Pittsburgh Penguins Joseph Blandisi
January 17, 2019	To Carolina Hurricanes Nino Niederreiter	To Minnesota Wild Victor Rask
January 17, 2019	To Philadelphia Flyers Justin Bailey	To Buffalo Sabres Taylor Leier
January 21, 2019	To Minnesota Wild Brad Hunt; 6th-round pick 2019	To Vegas Golden Knights conditional MIN 5th-round pick in 2019 or WSH 5th-round pick in 2019
January 24, 2019	To Chicago Blackhawks Dominik Kubalik	To Los Angeles Kings ARI 5th-round pick in 2019
January 28, 2019	To Dallas Stars Jamie Oleksiak	To Pittsburgh Penguins conditional MIN 4th-round pick in 2019 or PIT 4th-round pick in 2019
January 28, 2019	To Toronto Maple Leafs Jake Muzzin	To Los Angeles Kings Carl Grundstrom; Sean Durzi; 1st-round pick in 2019
January 30, 2019	To New Jersey Devils Ryan Murphy	To Minnesota Wild Michael Kapla

=== February ===
February 1, 2019	To Pittsburgh Penguins Nick Bjugstad; Jared McCann	To Florida Panthers Derick Brassard; Riley Sheahan; 2nd-round pick in 2019; 4th-round pick in 2019; MIN 4th-round pick in 2019
February 6, 2019	To Colorado Avalanche Max McCormick	To Ottawa Senators J.C. Beaudin
February 6, 2019	To Nashville Predators Brian Boyle	To New Jersey Devils 2nd-round pick in 2019
February 6, 2019	To Nashville Predators Cody McLeod	To New York Rangers 7th-round pick in 2020
February 8, 2019	To Arizona Coyotes Emil Pettersson	To Nashville Predators Adam Helewka; Laurent Dauphin
February 9, 2019	To Montreal Canadiens Dale Weise; Christian Folin*	To Philadelphia Flyers David Schlemko; Byron Froese
February 11, 2019	To Montreal Canadiens Nate Thompson; ARI 5th-round pick in 2019	To Los Angeles Kings CGY 4th-round pick in 2019
February 11, 2019	To Pittsburgh Penguins Blake Siebenaler	To Columbus Blue Jackets conditional 7th-round pick in 2019
February 12, 2019	To Vancouver Canucks Marek Mazanec	To New York Rangers 7th-round pick in 2020
February 15, 2019	To Philadelphia Flyers Cam Talbot	To Edmonton Oilers Anthony Stolarz
February 16, 2019	To Edmonton Oilers Sam Gagner	To Vancouver Canucks Ryan Spooner
February 18, 2019	To Chicago Blackhawks Peter Holland	To New York Rangers Darren Raddysh
February 20, 2019	To Boston Bruins Charlie Coyle	To Minnesota Wild Ryan Donato conditional NYR 4th-round pick in 2019 or BOS 5th-round pick in 2019
February 21, 2019	To Washington Capitals Carl Hagelin*	To Los Angeles Kings 3rd-round pick in 2019 conditional 6th-round pick in 2020
February 22, 2019	To Columbus Blue Jackets Matt Duchene; Julius Bergman	To Ottawa Senators Vitaly Abramov; Jonathan Davidsson conditional 1st-round pick in 2019 or 1st-round pick in 2020 conditional 1st-round pick in 2020 or 1st-round pick in 2021
February 22, 2019	To Florida Panthers Vincent Praplan	To San Jose Sharks future considerations
February 22, 2019	To Washington Capitals Nick Jensen; BUF 5th-round pick in 2019	To Detroit Red Wings Madison Bowey; 2nd-round pick in 2020
February 23, 2019	To Dallas Stars Ben Lovejoy	To New Jersey Devils Connor Carrick; 3rd-round pick in 2019
February 23, 2019	To Columbus Blue Jackets Ryan Dzingel; CGY 7th-round pick in 2019	To Ottawa Senators Anthony Duclair; 2nd-round pick in 2020; 2nd-round pick in 2021
February 23, 2019	To Dallas Stars Mats Zuccarello*	To New York Rangers conditional 1st-round pick in 2019 or 2nd-round pick in 2019 conditional 1st-round pick in 2020 or 3rd-round pick in 2020
February 24, 2019	To Chicago Blackhawks Spencer Watson	To Los Angeles Kings Matt Iacopelli
February 24, 2019	To Buffalo Sabres Brandon Montour	To Anaheim Ducks Brendan Guhle conditional SJS 1st-round pick in 2019 or STL 1st-round pick in 2019
February 24, 2019	To Toronto Maple Leafs Nicholas Baptiste	To Nashville Predators future considerations
February 25, 2019	To San Jose Sharks Gustav Nyquist*	To Detroit Red Wings conditional FLA 2nd-round pick in 2019 or SJS 2nd-round pick in 2019 conditional 2nd-round pick in 2020 or 3rd-round pick in 2020
February 25, 2019	To Ottawa Senators Brian Gibbons	To Anaheim Ducks Patrick Sieloff
February 25, 2019	To Columbus Blue Jackets Keith Kinkaid	To New Jersey Devils 5th-round pick in 2022
February 25, 2019	To Winnipeg Jets Kevin Hayes	To New York Rangers Brendan Lemieux conditional 1st-round pick in 2019 or 1st-round pick in 2020 conditional 4th-round pick in 2022
February 25, 2019	To Montreal Canadiens Jordan Weal	To Arizona Coyotes Michael Chaput
February 25, 2019	To Florida Panthers Cliff Pu	To Carolina Hurricanes future considerations
February 25, 2019	To Colorado Avalanche Derick Brassard conditional 6th-round pick in 2020	To Florida Panthers 3rd-round pick in 2020
February 25, 2019	To Columbus Blue Jackets Adam McQuaid	To New York Rangers Julius Bergman; 4th-round pick in 2019; 7th-round pick in 2019
February 25, 2019	To Calgary Flames Oscar Fantenberg	To Los Angeles Kings conditional 3rd-round pick in 2020 or 4th-round pick in 2020
February 25, 2019	To Nashville Predators Mikael Granlund	To Minnesota Wild Kevin Fiala
February 25, 2019	To Vegas Golden Knights Mark Stone; Tobias Lindberg	To Ottawa Senators Erik Brannstrom; Oscar Lindberg; DAL 2nd-round pick in 2020
February 25, 2019	To Nashville Predators Wayne Simmonds	To Philadelphia Flyers Ryan Hartman conditional 3rd-round pick in 2020 or 4th-round pick in 2020
February 25, 2019	To St. Louis Blues Michael Del Zotto	To Anaheim Ducks 6th-round pick in 2019
February 25, 2019	To Boston Bruins Marcus Johansson*	To New Jersey Devils 2nd-round pick in 2019; 4th-round pick in 2020
February 25, 2019	To Winnipeg Jets Matt Hendricks	To Minnesota Wild 7th-round pick in 2020
February 25, 2019	To Pittsburgh Penguins Erik Gudbranson	To Vancouver Canucks Tanner Pearson
February 25, 2019	To Winnipeg Jets Nathan Beaulieu	To Buffalo Sabres 6th-round pick in 2019
February 25, 2019	To Winnipeg Jets Bogdan Kiselevich	To Florida Panthers 7th-round pick in 2021
February 25, 2019	To San Jose Sharks Jonathan Dahlen	To Vancouver Canucks Linus Karlsson
February 25, 2019	To Toronto Maple Leafs Nic Petan	To Winnipeg Jets Par Lindholm
February 25, 2019	To Pittsburgh Penguins Chris Wideman	To Florida Panthers Jean-Sebastien Dea
February 25, 2019	To Winnipeg Jets Alex Broadhurst	To Columbus Blue Jackets future considerations

=== April ===
April 30, 2019	To New York Rangers Adam Fox	To Carolina Hurricanes 2nd-round pick in 2019 conditional 2nd-round pick in 2020 or 3rd-round pick in 2020

=== May ===
May 30, 2019	To Minnesota Wild Fedor Gordeev	To Toronto Maple Leafs conditional WPG 7th-round pick in 2020

=== June (2019) ===
June 3, 2019	To Philadelphia Flyers Kevin Hayes	To Winnipeg Jets 5th-round pick in 2019
June 14, 2019	To Philadelphia Flyers Matt Niskanen	To Washington Capitals Radko Gudas*
June 14, 2019	To Nashville Predators Connor Ingram	To Tampa Bay Lightning 7th-round pick in 2021
June 15, 2019	To Chicago Blackhawks Olli Maatta	To Pittsburgh Penguins Dominik Kahun; TBL 5th-round pick in 2019
June 17, 2019	To New York Rangers Jacob Trouba	To Winnipeg Jets Neal Pionk; WPG 1st-round pick in 2019
June 18, 2019	To Philadelphia Flyers Justin Braun	To San Jose Sharks 2nd-round pick in 2019; 3rd-round pick in 2020

== Waivers ==
Once an NHL player has played in a certain number of games or a set number of seasons has passed since the signing of his first NHL contract (see here), that player must be offered to all of the other NHL teams before he can be assigned to a minor league affiliate.

Date	Player	New team	Previous team	Ref
September 22, 2018	Danick Martel	Tampa Bay Lightning	Philadelphia Flyers	
September 28, 2018	Jean-Sebastien Dea	New Jersey Devils	Pittsburgh Penguins	
October 1, 2018	Pontus Aberg	Anaheim Ducks	Edmonton Oilers	
October 2, 2018	Remi Elie	Buffalo Sabres	Dallas Stars	
October 2, 2018	Dmitrij Jaskin	Washington Capitals	St. Louis Blues	
October 2, 2018	Curtis McElhinney	Carolina Hurricanes	Toronto Maple Leafs	
October 2, 2018	Calvin Pickard	Philadelphia Flyers	Toronto Maple Leafs	
October 15, 2018	Marko Dano	Colorado Avalanche	Winnipeg Jets	
October 17, 2018	Jacob de la Rose	Detroit Red Wings	Montreal Canadiens	
November 23, 2018	Marko Dano	Winnipeg Jets	Colorado Avalanche	
November 29, 2018	Jean-Sebastien Dea	Pittsburgh Penguins	New Jersey Devils	
November 29, 2018	Calvin Pickard	Arizona Coyotes	Philadelphia Flyers	
November 30, 2018	Valentin Zykov	Edmonton Oilers	Carolina Hurricanes	
December 2, 2018	Nikita Scherbak	Los Angeles Kings	Montreal Canadiens	
December 3, 2018	Brendan Leipsic	Los Angeles Kings	Vancouver Canucks	
December 6, 2018	Gemel Smith	Boston Bruins	Dallas Stars	
December 11, 2018	Chad Johnson	Anaheim Ducks	St. Louis Blues	
December 29, 2018	Valentin Zykov	Vegas Golden Knights	Edmonton Oilers	
January 1, 2019	Phillip Di Giuseppe	Nashville Predators	Carolina Hurricanes	
January 4, 2019	Mike McKenna	Philadelphia Flyers	Vancouver Canucks	
January 15, 2019	Colby Cave	Edmonton Oilers	Boston Bruins	
January 25, 2019	Anthony Bitetto	Minnesota Wild	Nashville Predators	
February 11, 2019	Kenny Agostino	New Jersey Devils	Montreal Canadiens	
February 20, 2019	Micheal Haley	San Jose Sharks	Florida Panthers	

== See also ==
- 2018 NHL entry draft
- 2019 NHL entry draft
- 2018 in sports
- 2019 in sports
- 2017–18 NHL transactions
- 2019–20 NHL transactions
