= Mike Hoffman (ice hockey, born 1989) =

Canadian ice hockey player (born 1989)

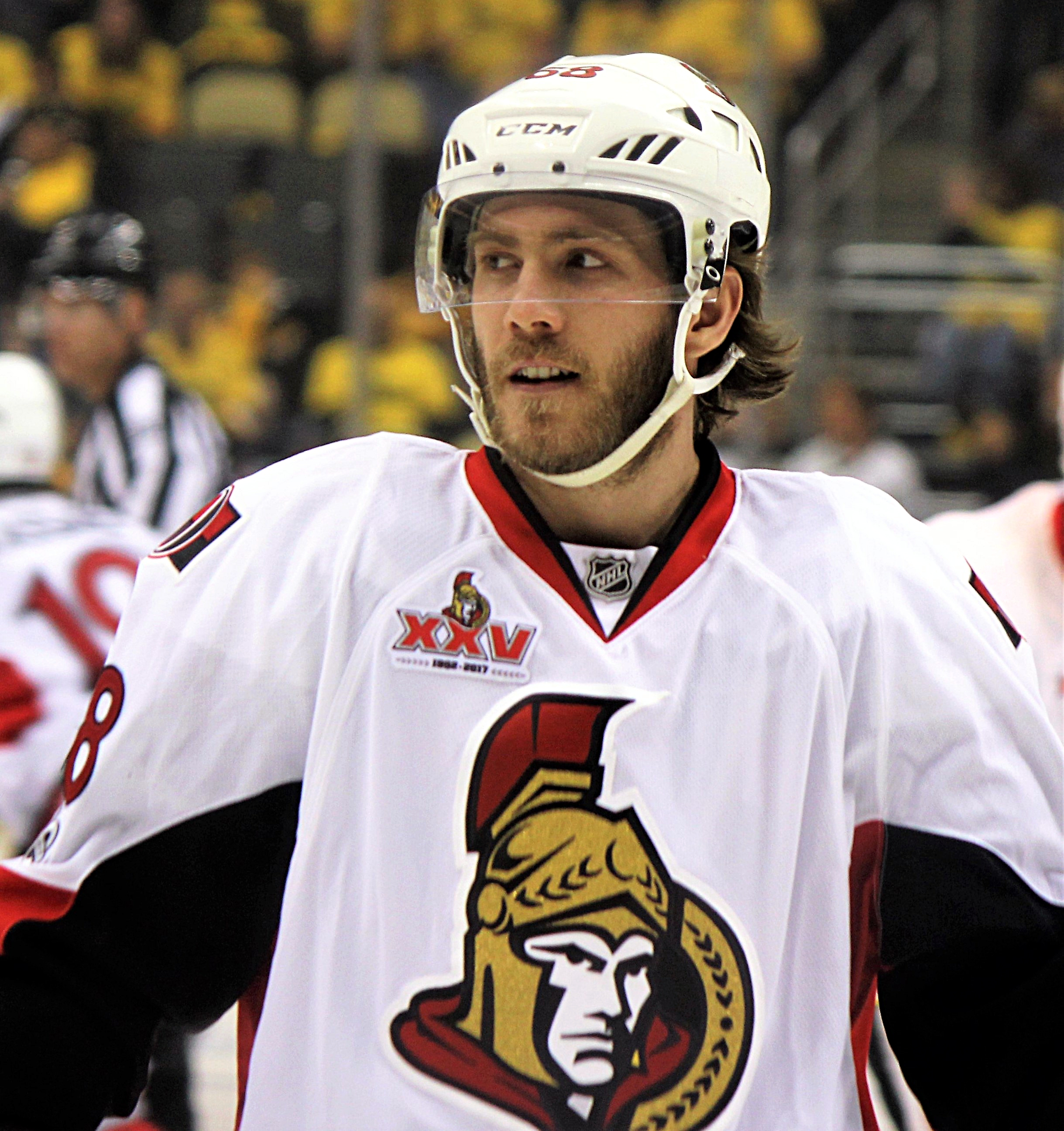
- Hoffman with the Ottawa Senators during the 2017 Stanley Cup playoffs
- Born: November 24, 1989 (age 36) Kitchener, Ontario, Canada
- Height: 6 ft 0 in (183 cm)
- Weight: 190 lb (86 kg; 13 st 8 lb)
- Position: Left wing
- Shoots: Left
- NHL team Former teams: Free agent Ottawa Senators; Florida Panthers; St. Louis Blues; Montreal Canadiens; San Jose Sharks
- NHL draft: 130th overall, 2009; Ottawa Senators
- Playing career: 2010–present

Michael Hoffman (born November 24, 1989) is a Canadian professional ice hockey winger who is currently a free agent. He recently played for the San Jose Sharks of the National Hockey League (NHL). He was selected in the fifth round, 130th overall, by the Ottawa Senators in the 2009 NHL entry draft. Hoffman has also previously played for the Florida Panthers, Montreal Canadiens, and St. Louis Blues.

== Playing career ==
=== Junior ===
Hoffman started his junior hockey career with the Kitchener Dutchmen of the Mid-Western Junior Hockey League in 2006–07, earning a rookie of the year nomination. At the end of the 2006–07 season, the Kitchener Rangers of the Ontario Hockey League (OHL) called him up for two games in the season, and four in the playoffs, going scoreless. At the start of the 2007–08 season, he failed to make the Rangers. Since no OHL team picked him up, he transferred to the Quebec Major Junior Hockey League (QMJHL).

Hoffman first joined the Gatineau Olympiques of the QMJHL but was released after 19 games, in which he recorded five goals and seven assists for 12 points. In 2010, Olympiques General Manager Charlie Henry said that Hoffman was "a good player for us, but he didn't work as hard as he works today." The QMJHL's last-place Drummondville Voltigeurs eventually picked him up and he finished the season with 24 goals in 62 games. He was not selected in the National Hockey League (NHL)'s 2008 entry draft, his first year of eligibility. However, he attended the NHL's Philadelphia Flyers' training camp on an amateur tryout and was released on September 29.

Hoffman then returned to Drummondville. In the 2008–09 season, he achieved prominence by scoring 52 goals in 62 games with the Voltigeurs, who came from last in the 2007–08 season to win the 2009 QMJHL championship title and a berth in the 2009 Memorial Cup. In Game 7 for the QMJHL championship, Hoffman scored a goal and an assist in Drummondville's 3–2 win over the Shawinigan Cataractes, finishing with 21 goals in 19 games in the playoffs. He was then selected by the Ottawa Senators 130th overall in the 2009 NHL entry draft at the age of 19. The Senators could have signed him after the draft as a free agent had he gone unselected, but 14 other NHL teams had shown interest in drafting him, necessitating Ottawa's selection. Hoffman subsequently attended the Senators' development and training camps and played in a pre-season game against the Montreal Canadiens, but was designated for assignment and returned to the QMJHL.

Hoffman played the 2009–10 season, his "over-age" season, for the Saint John Sea Dogs, who traded a second-round draft choice to Drummondville for the player. Hoffman recorded 85 points (46 goals, 39 assists) in 56 games. His goal scoring broke the all-time goal single-season scoring record for the Sea Dogs, surpassing Scott Howes' goal total. His point total also placed him third in the QMJHL in goals, tied for second in power-play goals (17) and seventh in overall scoring. Hoffman was also named a First Team QMJHL All-Star, won the league's Most Valuable Player trophy, the League Sportsman of the Year trophy and was a finalist for the Canadian Hockey League (CHL) Player of the Year award.

=== Professional ===
==== Ottawa Senators ====
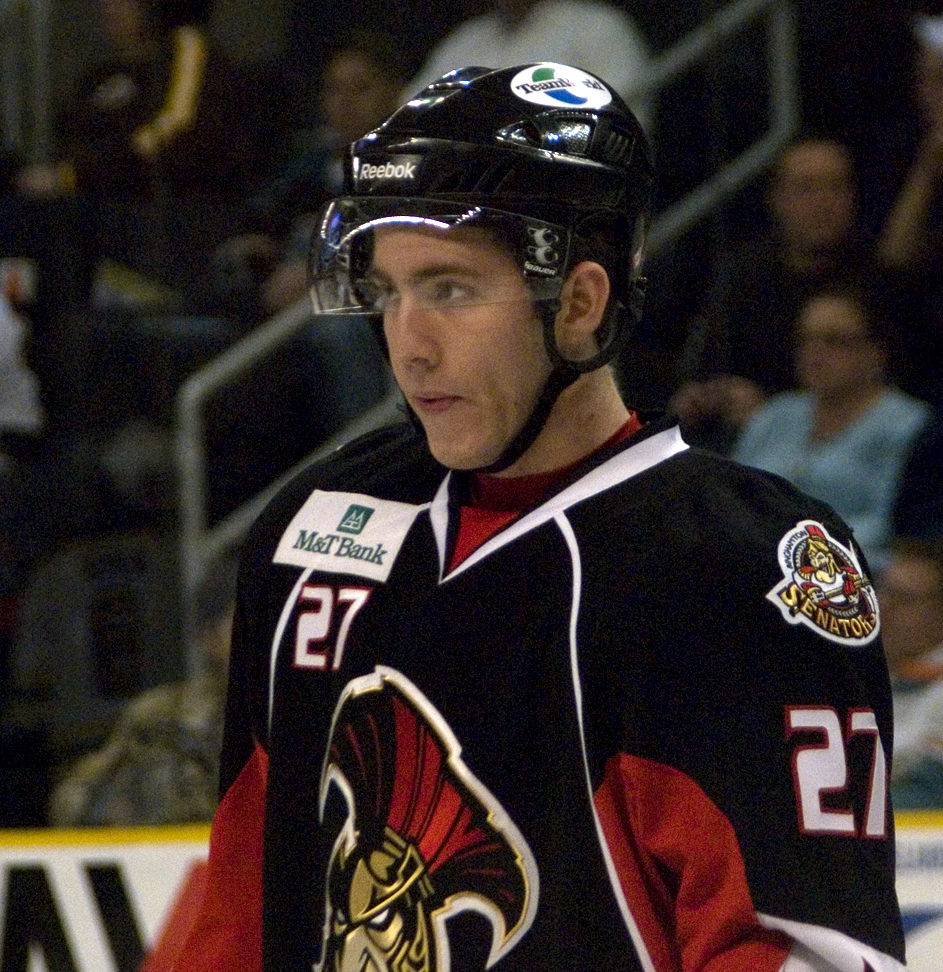
Hoffman with the Binghamton Senators in 2011

In July 2010, Hoffman attended the Ottawa Senators' development camp, and on July 22, 2010, he signed an entry-level contract with the NHL club. After attending rookie camp and training camp with Ottawa, Hoffman was assigned to the Binghamton Senators, the Senators' American Hockey League (AHL) affiliate, where he made his professional debut, but was soon sent to the Elmira Jackals of the ECHL, Ottawa's second-tier affiliate to begin the season. After a brief four-game stint with Elmira in which he tallied three assists, he was returned to Binghamton. Hoffman played the majority of the season with Binghamton, making 74 appearances and tallying seven goals and 25 points. Binghamton qualified for the playoffs and advanced to the final where Hoffman was a member of the 2011 Calder Cup-winning team. In 19 playoff games, Hoffman added one goal and nine points.

Hoffman returned to Binghamton for the 2011–12 season. He led the team in scoring for the season, marking 21 goals and 49 points in 76 games. He was recalled to Ottawa on December 23, 2011, and made his NHL debut that night in a 2–1 loss to the Carolina Hurricanes. He was returned to the AHL the next day. Hoffman was the leading scorer for Binghamton during the 2012–13 season prior to suffering a broken collarbone just before the AHL All-Star Game on January 26, 2013. He missed a month with the injury. He was recalled on March 27 by Ottawa. He played three games with Ottawa before re-injuring the collarbone and missing the last 12 regular season and first 10 playoff games. He finished the season with 41 games played with Binghamton, recording 13 goals and 28 points, and going scoreless in the three games with Ottawa.

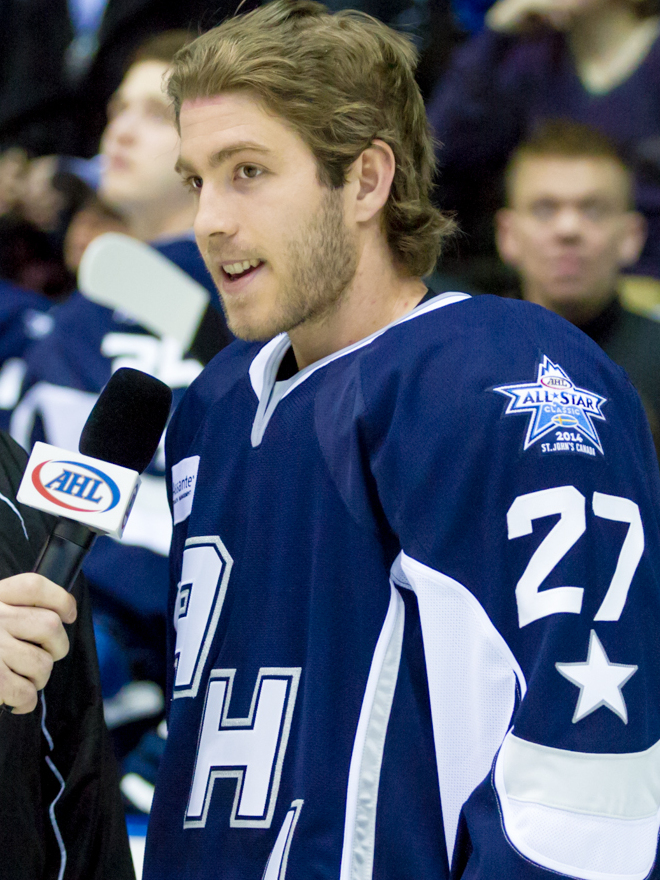
Hoffman at the 2014 AHL All-Star Skills Competition in St. John's, Newfoundland and Labrador

In the offseason, as a restricted free agent, Hoffman signed a one-year, two-way contract with Ottawa on July 17. Hoffman began the 2013–14 season in Binghamton and was named one of the team's alternate captains by head coach Luke Richardson. He was recalled to Ottawa on December 2, after recording 26 points in 21 games, the second-highest point total in the AHL at the time. He was re-assigned to Binghamton on December 11 and was selected to represent Binghamton at the 2014 AHL All-Star Classic on February 12, 2014, posting three points and was named the player of the game. He was recalled to Ottawa in February 2014, playing on a line with Mika Zibanejad and Bobby Ryan. He scored his first NHL goal on March 8 in a 5–3 win over the Winnipeg Jets. He finished the season with 30 goals and 57 points in 51 games with Binghamton and three goals and six points in 25 games with Ottawa.

In 2014–15, Hoffman remained with Ottawa after training camp, as he was out of option years and the Senators were afraid that he would be claimed on waivers. He played the whole season in Ottawa and his 27 goals led the team and had 48 points. He was selected to play in the NHL All-Star weekend and led all NHL rookies in goals. He finished sixth in voting for the Calder Trophy for NHL rookie of the year. The Senators qualified for the playoffs and faced the Montreal Canadiens in the first round best-of-seven series, with the Senators predicted to win. The Senators' rookies, consisting of Hoffman, Mark Stone, and Curtis Lazar, were considered keys to their play. Hoffman made his NHL playoff debut on April 15 in Game 1. He marked his first NHL playoff goal, and the game winner, on April 22 in Game 4. However, the Canadiens took the series in six games, eliminating the Senators, behind the play of superstar goaltender Carey Price. Hoffman recorded one goal and three points in the six games.

Following the season Hoffman became a restricted free agent under the NHL Collective Bargaining Agreement. Ottawa made him a qualifying offer to retain his NHL rights and, on July 5, 2015, Hoffman filed for salary arbitration. According to media reports, Hoffman asked for $3.4 million, while the Senators countered with $1.7 million. Hoffman was awarded a one-year $2 million deal, which the Senators accepted. He started the 2015–16 season on the team's top line alongside Bobby Ryan and Kyle Turris. On October 17, he scored two goals and assisted on another by Mark Stone for a three-point night in a 4–3 shootout loss to the Nashville Predators. He had a second three-point night on December 3, scoring two goals and assisting on another by Bobby Ryan in a 4–3 victory over the Chicago Blackhawks, and a third on December 14 in which he scored two and set up another by Mika Zibanejad in a 5–3 victory over the Los Angeles Kings. However, by March 2016, Hoffman had been demoted to the fourth line by head coach Dave Cameron alongside Chris Neil and Curtis Lazar, despite being the team's highest scoring winger. He finished the season with 29 goals and 59 points in 78 games.

Hoffman became a restricted free agent at the end of the season. On July 27, 2016, he re-signed with the Senators to a four-year, $20.75 million deal, thereby avoiding arbitration. He began the season the Senators' top line and first power play unit under new head coach Guy Boucher after Dave Cameron was fired in the offseason. On October 18, he tallied three assists, setting up goals by Mark Stone, Kyle Turris, and Bobby Ryan, in a 7–4 victory over the Arizona Coyotes. On November 22, he scored one goal and assisted on two others by Derick Brassard and Mark Stone in a three-point game as part of a 4–3 win over the Montreal Canadiens. On November 29, Hoffman recorded a hat trick against the Buffalo Sabres in a 5–4 losing effort. He also assisted on Mark Stone's goal, for a four-point night. On December 16, Hoffman was suspended for two games for a cross-checking incident on Logan Couture of the San Jose Sharks. By February 2017, Hoffman was moved to a new third line alongside Jean-Gabriel Pageau and Tom Pyatt in order to balance his qualities on offence with some defensive-minded players. Hoffman finished the season with 26 goals and 61 points in 74 appearances for Ottawa. The Senators qualified for the 2017 playoffs and advanced to the Eastern Conference final, where they were eliminated in double overtime in the seventh game of the seven-game series against the Pittsburgh Penguins. In 19 playoff games, Hoffman tallied six goals and 11 points.

He returned to the Senators for the 2017–18 season but was tried out on the second line with Kyle Turris and Zack Smith. Hoffman marked two goals and assisted on another by Chris Wideman in a 6–1 victory over the Edmonton Oilers on October 15. However, by December, the Senators were struggling, and Hoffman was among the players that analysts rumoured could be traded. On January 5, 2018, Hoffman scored one goal and assisted on two others by Mark Stone and Matt Duchene in a 6–5 overtime win over the San Jose Sharks. On April 2, he registered three assists on goals by Matt Duchene, Craig Wolanin, and Thomas Chabot. In 82 appearances with Ottawa, he registered 22 goals and 56 points.

===== Fiancée harassment controversy =====
On May 4, 2018, teammate Erik Karlsson's wife, Melinda, filed an order of protection against Hoffman's fiancée, Monika Caryk. The order came in response to a large number of harassing messages directed toward the Karlssons over an extended period of time, allegedly originating from Caryk. The alleged harassment included utilizing multiple fake social media accounts to direct over 1,000 "negative and derogatory" comments towards the Karlssons, including comments wishing that someone would injure Erik Karlsson’s legs to end his career, and others wishing Karlsson's wife and her then-unborn child dead. The Karlssons' son was later stillborn.

During a 2018 court deposition, Caryk burst into tears and threatened to leave the room during questioning. She told the court that she and Melinda Karlsson began as friends and that the Karlssons were never outwardly hostile towards her. When asked how the friendship deteriorated, Caryk stated that she became offended after her Facebook and Instagram posts stopped receiving "likes" from Melinda Karlsson, and Caryk became more upset when she stopped receiving invitations to team dinners organized for wives and girlfriends of Senators' players. The deposition revealed that wives and girlfriends of several players associated with the Senators and other organizations had contacted Caryk privately before the matter had ever gone public, admonishing her for her continued and increasing hostility towards the Karlssons.

Although the allegations against Caryk remained unproven in a court of law, Hoffman was swiftly traded from Ottawa once the harassment allegations were made public. Senators' goaltender Craig Anderson later hinted that the situation was a factor in his own poor performance and request to be traded after signing a contract extension the season prior. He noted that he felt the situation had been resolved with Hoffman's exit from the team.

==== Florida Panthers ====
On June 19, 2018, the Senators traded Hoffman, along with Cody Donaghey and a fifth-round pick of the 2020 NHL entry draft to the San Jose Sharks in exchange for Mikkel Bødker, Julius Bergman, and a sixth-round pick in the 2020 draft. About two hours later, he was traded to the Florida Panthers together with a seventh-round pick of the 2018 NHL entry draft for a fourth-round and fifth-round pick of the 2018 draft and a second-round pick of the 2019 NHL entry draft. Hoffman made his Panthers debut in the 2018–19 season in a 2–1 shootout win over the Tampa Bay Lightning on October 6. He began the season on the first line alongside Aleksander Barkov and Evgenii Dadonov. On October 13, 2018, Hoffman embarked on a 17–game point streak with the Panthers, scoring ten goals and ten assists, breaking the franchise record previously held by Pavel Bure with 13 games in 1999–00. He recorded his first point as a Panther that night, assisting on Vincent Trocheck's goal in a 3–2 loss to the Vancouver Canucks. He then scored his first goal for Florida in the following game on October 16, a 6–5 shootout loss to the Philadelphia Flyers. By early December, Hoffman and Barkov remained on the first line, but Jonathan Huberdeau switched places with Dadonov. Going into the 2019 trade deadline with Florida not in a playoff position, the Panthers asked Hoffman for a list of places he would accept a trade to, but ultimately, he was not traded. He finished the season appearing in 82 games with career highs in goals (36) and points (70).

Going into the 2019–20 season, Hoffman found himself on the second line with Trocheck and Brett Connolly. In the team's home opening game, Hoffman recorded a hat trick in a 4–3 victory over the Tampa Bay Lightning. He scored one goal and assisted on two others by Dadonov and Anton Strålman to help the Panthers to a 5–4 comeback victory over the Detroit Red Wings. He finished the season registering 29 goals and 59 points in 69 games, before the NHL suspended play due to the COVID-19 pandemic on 12 March 2020. When play resumed in the pandemic-postponed 2020 Stanley Cup playoffs, the Panthers faced the New York Islanders in the qualifying round. The Islanders took the series in four games. Hoffman added three goals and five points in the four games.

==== St. Louis Blues ====
Going into the offseason, up to 15 teams showed interest in Hoffman's services with five serious contenders. Some were waiting for resolutions to ongoing contract negotiations with other players before committing to him, with others choosing to sign other players. On December 27, 2020, Hoffman signed a professional tryout agreement with the St. Louis Blues. On January 11, 2021, Hoffman and the Blues officially agreed on a one-year, $4 million contract, after the retirement of Alex Steen opened a permanent spot on the roster. He made his Blues debut in the pandemic-shortened 2020–21 season on January 15 in a 8–0 loss to the Colorado Avalanche. He recorded his first goal for the team in the next game on January 18, in a 5–4 victory over the San Jose Sharks. On April 14, he was involved in all three of St. Louis' goals when marked two and assisted on another by Vince Dunn in a 4–3 losing effort to Colorado. He performed the same feat again in April when he tallied two goals and assisted on the game-winning goal by Robert Thomas in a 4–3 win over the Minnesota Wild on April 28. Hoffman tallied 17 goals and 36 points in 52 games. In a top-six scoring role he recorded seven of his goals on the power play, leading the Blues. Hoffman added one goal in four playoff contests against the Colorado Avalanche.

==== Montreal Canadiens ====
On July 28, 2021, Hoffman was signed a three-year, $13.5 million contract with the Montreal Canadiens as an unrestricted free agent. On reporting to training camp, it was found that Hoffman had a knee injury that would cause him to miss up to four weeks. As a result he did not play in any of the team's pre-season games. In his two seasons with the Canadiens, Hoffman scored 15 goals and 35 points in 67 games during the 2021–22 season and 14 goals and 34 points in 64 games in 2022–23. With Montreal, Hoffman was described as a "one-way player" lacking defence and a streaky player, elevating his game for short periods. On March 24, 2023 Boston Bruins forward A. J. Greer was suspended by the NHL for one for a cross-check to Hoffman's face. Hoffman was upset with the NHL's inconsistency of Greer's suspension, taking to social media stating that he had received a larger suspension for a less egregious check to the head.

==== San Jose Sharks ====
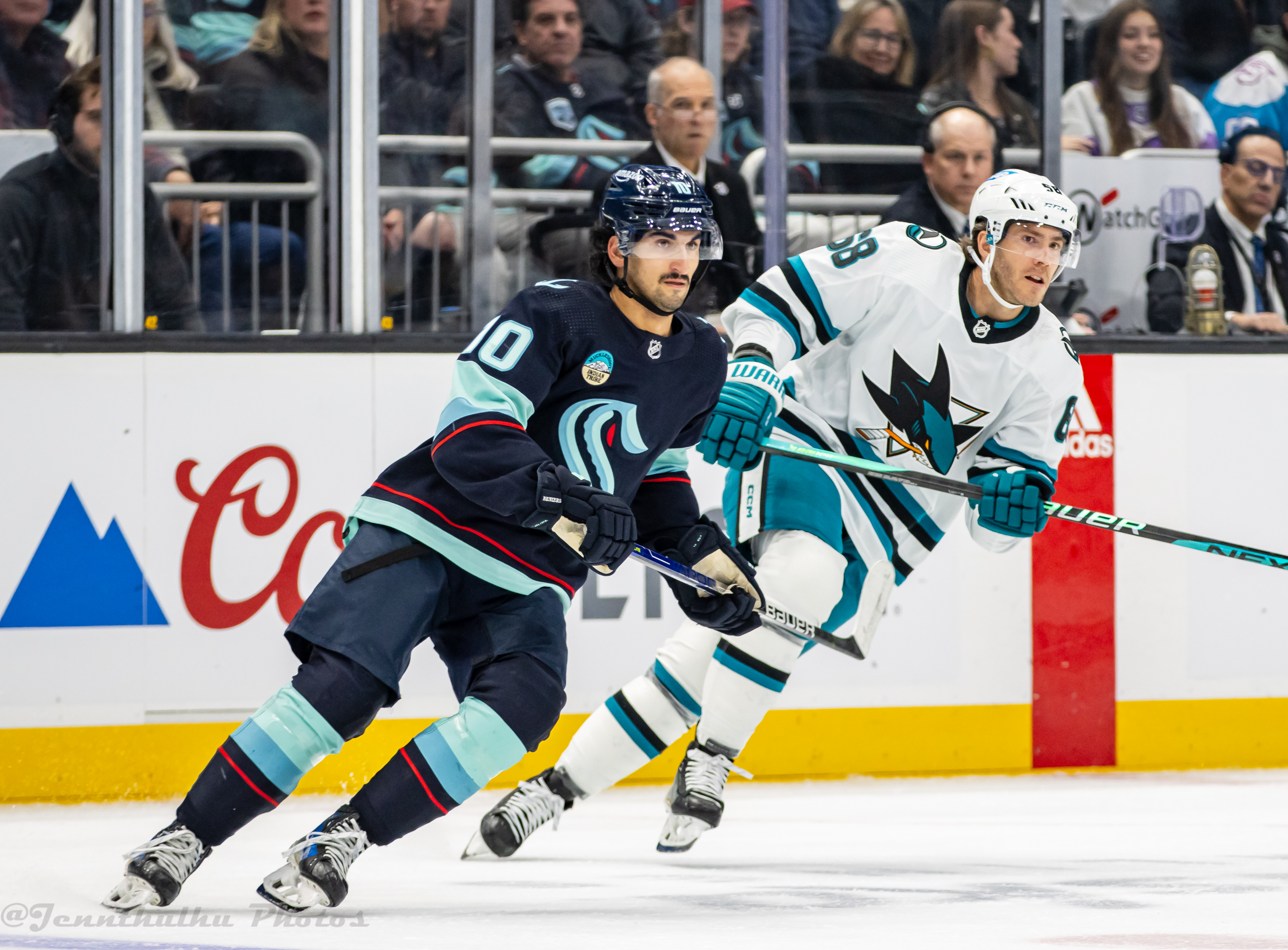
Hoffman (right) with Matty Beniers of the Seattle Kraken in 2023.

On August 6, 2023, Hoffman was initially traded to the Pittsburgh Penguins as part of a three-team trade also involving the San Jose Sharks. San Jose then acquired him from Pittsburgh. He made his Sharks debut on opening night, October 12, in a 4–1 loss to the Vegas Golden Knights. He recorded his first point with the Sharks in the next game on October 15, assisting on Thomas Bordeleau's first period goal in a 2–1 shootout loss to the Colorado Avalanche. He did not score his first goal until November 14, in a 5–3 loss to the Florida Panthers. Hoffman suffered a concussion after being checked from behind by Ottawa Senators' winger Brady Tkachuk in a game on March 9, 2024. He returned to the lineup on March 28 after missing eight games. In 66 games with San Jose he scored ten goals and 23 points. A free agent at season's end, on September 18, Hoffman signed a professional try-out agreement (PTO) with the Edmonton Oilers. On September 30, Hoffman was released from the PTO.

== Career statistics ==
			Regular season					Playoffs
Season	Team	League	GP	G	A	Pts	PIM	GP	G	A	Pts	PIM
2005–06	Kitchener Dutchmen	MWJHL	2	0	1	1	0	—	—	—	—	—
2006–07	Kitchener Dutchmen	MWJHL	47	28	29	57	70	6	3	5	8	6
2006–07	Kitchener Rangers	OHL	2	0	0	0	2	4	0	0	0	0
2007–08	Gatineau Olympiques	QMJHL	19	5	7	12	16	—	—	—	—	—
2007–08	Drummondville Voltigeurs	QMJHL	43	19	17	36	77	—	—	—	—	—
2008–09	Drummondville Voltigeurs	QMJHL	62	52	42	94	86	19	21	13	34	26
2009–10	Saint John Sea Dogs	QMJHL	56	46	39	85	38	21	11	13	24	23
2010–11	Binghamton Senators	AHL	74	7	18	25	16	19	1	8	9	16
2010–11	Elmira Jackals	ECHL	4	0	3	3	0	—	—	—	—	—
2011–12	Binghamton Senators	AHL	76	21	28	49	44	—	—	—	—	—
2011–12	Ottawa Senators	NHL	1	0	0	0	0	—	—	—	—	—
2012–13	Binghamton Senators	AHL	41	13	15	28	38	—	—	—	—	—
2012–13	Ottawa Senators	NHL	3	0	0	0	2	—	—	—	—	—
2013–14	Binghamton Senators	AHL	51	30	37	67	32	—	—	—	—	—
2013–14	Ottawa Senators	NHL	25	3	3	6	2	—	—	—	—	—
2014–15	Ottawa Senators	NHL	79	27	21	48	14	6	1	2	3	2
2015–16	Ottawa Senators	NHL	78	29	30	59	18	—	—	—	—	—
2016–17	Ottawa Senators	NHL	74	26	35	61	51	19	6	5	11	10
2017–18	Ottawa Senators	NHL	82	22	34	56	34	—	—	—	—	—
2018–19	Florida Panthers	NHL	82	36	34	70	30	—	—	—	—	—
2019–20	Florida Panthers	NHL	69	29	30	59	28	4	3	2	5	4
2020–21	St. Louis Blues	NHL	52	17	19	36	10	4	1	0	1	4
2021–22	Montreal Canadiens	NHL	67	15	20	35	32	—	—	—	—	—
2022–23	Montreal Canadiens	NHL	67	14	20	34	28	—	—	—	—	—
2023–24	San Jose Sharks	NHL	66	10	13	23	20	—	—	—	—	—
NHL totals			745	228	259	487	267	33	11	9	20	20

== Awards and honours ==
Award	Year
QMJHL
First Team All-Star	2009, 2010
Michel Brière Memorial Trophy	2010
Frank J. Selke Memorial Trophy	2010
CHL Second All-Star Team	2010
AHL
Calder Cup (Binghamton Senators)	2011
AHL All-Star Game	2014
AHL First All-Star Team	2014
NHL
NHL All-Star Skills Competition (Rookie Competitor)	2015

Awards and achievements
Preceded by Nicola Riopel	Michel Brière Memorial Trophy; 2009–10	Succeeded by Sean Couturier
