= Vitalii Abramov =

Russian ice hockey player (born 1998)

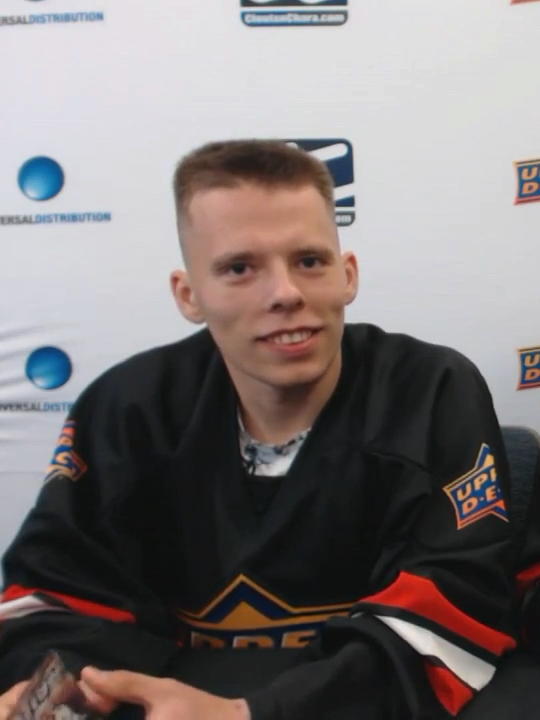
- Abramov in 2018
- Born: May 8, 1998 (age 28) Chelyabinsk, Russia
- Height: 5 ft 9 in (175 cm)
- Weight: 180 lb (82 kg; 12 st 12 lb)
- Position: Winger
- Shoots: Left
- KHL team Former teams: Amur Khabarovsk; Ottawa Senators; Jukurit; Traktor Chelyabinsk; CSKA Moscow
- NHL draft: 65th overall, 2016; Columbus Blue Jackets
- Playing career: 2017–present

Vitalii Igorevich Abramov (Russian: Виталий Игоревич Абрамов; born May 8, 1998) is a Russian professional ice hockey player who is a winger for Amur Khabarovsk of the Kontinental Hockey League (KHL). Abramov has played five games in the National Hockey League (NHL) with the Ottawa Senators. Abramov was selected 65th overall by the Columbus Blue Jackets in the 2016 NHL entry draft and later traded to Ottawa.

== Playing career ==
In his rookie season with the Gatineau Olympiques of the Quebec Major Junior Hockey League (QMJHL), the 2015–16 season, Abramov recorded 93 points in 63 games. He was awarded the RDS Cup as QMJHL Rookie of the Year and the Michel Bergeron Trophy as Offensive Rookie of the Year. He was also named to the All-Rookie Team. Leading up to the 2016 NHL entry draft, Abramov was ranked 29th overall for North American skaters by the NHL Central Scouting Bureau. He was eventually drafted 65th overall by the Columbus Blue Jackets.

On December 24, 2016, Abramov was signed to a three-year, entry-level contract with the Columbus Blue Jackets. After recording 104 points in 66 games, Abramov was awarded the Jean Béliveau Trophy as the top regular season scorer of the 2016–17 season. He was also awarded the Michel Brière Memorial Trophy as the most valuable player (MVP) of the QMJHL and named to the First All-Star Team. On April 7, 2017, Abramov began his professional career when he was assigned to the Blue Jackets American Hockey League (AHL) affiliate, the Cleveland Monsters.

The following season, Abramov returned to the Olympiques in the QMJHL. On November 17, Abramov was traded to the Victoriaville Tigres along with a 2018 sixth-round QMJHL draft pick in exchange for four future draft picks. He still found success with his new team and was named to the Second All-Star Team after recording 78 points in 40 games.

Abramov attended the Blue Jackets 2018–19 training camp but failed to make their final roster and was assigned to the AHL to join the Cleveland Monsters. Abramov posted 12 goals and 22 points in 52 games with the Monsters before he was traded by the Blue Jackets, along with Jonathan Davidsson and two conditional first-round picks to the Ottawa Senators in exchange for Matt Duchene and Julius Bergman on February 22, 2019. He scored his first NHL goal on October 10, 2019, against the St. Louis Blues.

As an impending restricted free agent from the Senators, Abramov opted to pause his North American career by agreeing to a two-year contract with the Russian club, Traktor Chelyabinsk of the Kontinental Hockey League (KHL), on 26 May 2021. In the 2021–22 season, Abramov made 41 appearances with his hometown club, Traktor, posting 8 goals and 17 points through the mid-point of the campaign. On 27 December 2021, Abramov was traded by Chelyabinsk to CSKA Moscow in exchange for Artyom Blazhiyevsky.

On 10 June 2026, Abramov was traded by CSKA to Amur Khabarovsk in exchange for financial compensation.

== Career statistics ==
=== Regular season and playoffs ===
| | | | Regular season | | | | | Playoffs |
| Season | Team | League | GP | G | A | Pts | PIM | GP | G | A | Pts | PIM |
|---|---|---|---|---|---|---|---|---|---|---|---|---|
| 2014–15 | Belye Medvedi | MHL | 20 | 8 | 6 | 14 | 8 | 2 | 0 | 0 | 0 | 4 |
| 2015–16 | Gatineau Olympiques | QMJHL | 63 | 38 | 55 | 93 | 36 | 10 | 7 | 6 | 13 | 8 |
| 2016–17 | Gatineau Olympiques | QMJHL | 66 | 46 | 58 | 104 | 76 | 7 | 1 | 6 | 7 | 12 |
| 2016–17 | Cleveland Monsters | AHL | 4 | 1 | 3 | 4 | 2 | — | — | — | — | — |
| 2017–18 | Gatineau Olympiques | QMJHL | 16 | 12 | 14 | 26 | 21 | — | — | — | — | — |
| 2017–18 | Victoriaville Tigres | QMJHL | 40 | 33 | 45 | 78 | 46 | 13 | 9 | 7 | 16 | 21 |
| 2018–19 | Cleveland Monsters | AHL | 52 | 12 | 10 | 22 | 28 | — | — | — | — | — |
| 2018–19 | Belleville Senators | AHL | 18 | 4 | 3 | 7 | 8 | — | — | — | — | — |
| 2018–19 | Ottawa Senators | NHL | 1 | 0 | 0 | 0 | 0 | — | — | — | — | — |
| 2019–20 | Belleville Senators | AHL | 51 | 18 | 23 | 41 | 30 | — | — | — | — | — |
| 2019–20 | Ottawa Senators | NHL | 2 | 1 | 0 | 1 | 2 | — | — | — | — | — |
| 2020–21 | Jukurit | Liiga | 8 | 5 | 2 | 7 | 2 | — | — | — | — | — |
| 2020–21 | Belleville Senators | AHL | 23 | 7 | 12 | 19 | 10 | — | — | — | — | — |
| 2020–21 | Ottawa Senators | NHL | 2 | 0 | 0 | 0 | 0 | — | — | — | — | — |
| 2021–22 | Traktor Chelyabinsk | KHL | 41 | 8 | 9 | 17 | 26 | — | — | — | — | — |
| 2021–22 | CSKA Moscow | KHL | 4 | 0 | 0 | 0 | 2 | 22 | 5 | 4 | 9 | 6 |
| 2022–23 | CSKA Moscow | KHL | 52 | 11 | 5 | 16 | 20 | 26 | 4 | 1 | 5 | 6 |
| 2023–24 | CSKA Moscow | KHL | 59 | 13 | 19 | 32 | 22 | 5 | 1 | 0 | 1 | 2 |
| 2024–25 | CSKA Moscow | KHL | 44 | 19 | 16 | 35 | 33 | — | — | — | — | — |
| 2025–26 | CSKA Moscow | KHL | 63 | 11 | 14 | 25 | 24 | 9 | 1 | 3 | 4 | 0 |
| NHL totals | | | 5 | 1 | 0 | 1 | 2 | — | — | — | — | — |
| KHL totals | | | 263 | 62 | 63 | 125 | 127 | 62 | 11 | 8 | 19 | 14 |

=== International ===
| Year | Team | Event | Result | GP | G | A | Pts | PIM |
|---|---|---|---|---|---|---|---|---|
| 2014 | Russia | U17 | 1st place, gold medalist(s) | 6 | 3 | 6 | 9 | 2 |
| 2018 | Russia | WJC | 5th | 5 | 1 | 0 | 1 | 4 |
| Junior totals | | | | 11 | 4 | 6 | 10 | 6 |

== Awards and honours ==
| Award | Year |
|---|---|
QMJHL
| CHL Top Prospects Game | 2016 |
| All-Rookie Team | 2016 |
| Michel Bergeron Trophy | 2016 |
| Rookie of the Year | 2016 |
| First All-Star Team | 2017 |
| Jean Béliveau Trophy | 2017 |
| Michel Brière Memorial Trophy | 2017 |
| Second All-Star Team | 2018 |
KHL
| Gagarin Cup (CSKA Moscow) | 2022, 2023 |
