= Julius Bergman =

Swedish ice hockey player (born 1995)

- Born: 2 November 1995 (age 30) Stockholm, Sweden
- Height: 6 ft 1 in (185 cm)
- Weight: 196 lb (89 kg; 14 st 0 lb)
- Position: Defence
- Shoots: Right
- Allsvenskan team Former teams: Nybro Vikings; Frölunda HC; Worcester Sharks; San Jose Barracuda; Belleville Senators; Hartford Wolf Pack; Lahti Pelicans; Brynäs IF; HC Slovan Bratislava
- NHL draft: 46th overall, 2014; San Jose Sharks
- Playing career: 2012–present

Julius Bergman (born 2 November 1995) is a Swedish professional ice hockey defenceman for the Nybro Vikings of HockeyAllsvenskan.

Bergman was selected by the San Jose Sharks in the second round (46th overall) of the 2014 NHL entry draft.

== Playing career ==
Bergman grew up playing youth hockey in Sweden, initially with the junior teams affiliated with Karlskrona HK before being loaned to the Frölunda HC organization, where he played firstly with the J18 team before being moved to the J20 team. Bergman made his debut with the senior Frölunda team during the 2013 European Trophy.

Bergman signed a three-year entry-level contract with the San Jose Sharks on July 16, 2014. He spent the 2014–15 season playing major junior hockey in Canada with the London Knights of the Ontario Hockey League. Bergman played three seasons with the Sharks' American Hockey League (AHL) affiliate San Jose Barracuda. He had his best season in 2017–18, scoring ten goals and ten assists.

On June 19, 2018, he was traded by the Sharks alongside Mikkel Bødker and a sixth-round pick of the 2020 NHL entry draft to the Ottawa Senators in exchange for Mike Hoffman, Cody Donaghey and a fifth-round pick in 2020. After attending his first training camp with the Senators, Bergman was assigned to begin the 2018–19 season with AHL affiliate, the Belleville Senators. Bergman was unable to replicate his previous contributions in the AHL, posting just 6 assists in 33 games from the blueline. In February, Swedish sports paper Sportbladet reported that Bergman intended to return to Frölunda at the end of the season.

On February 22, 2019, Bergman was included in the trade of Matt Duchene by the Senators to the Columbus Blue Jackets in exchange for prospects Vitaly Abramov, Jonathan Davidsson and two conditional first-round picks in 2019 and 2020. He was immediately reassigned to the Blue Jackets' AHL affiliate, the Cleveland Monsters. Before Bergman could make his debut with the Monsters, the Blue Jackets traded him at the trade deadline to the New York Rangers along with fourth- and seventh-round picks in the 2019 NHL entry draft in exchange for Adam McQuaid. Bergman played 10 games to play out the remainder of the season with the Rangers AHL affiliate, the Hartford Wolf Pack.

Unable to break through to the NHL, as an impending restricted free agent from the Rangers, Bergman opted to return to continue his career in Sweden, signing a two-year contract with his original club, Frölunda HC, on May 8, 2019. In his return to Frölunda, Bergman struggled to find his role on the club in the 2019–20 season, contributing with just 6 assists through 42 regular season games before the COVID-19 pandemic cancelled the playoffs.

On 21 April 2020, Bergman terminated the final year of his contract with Frölunda, opting to sign a two-year deal with Finnish club, Lahti Pelicans of the Liiga.

During the 2022–23 season, Bergman went scoreless in 28 regular season games with Brynäs IF, before opting to move to second tier HockeyAllsvenskan club, Södertälje SK, on a three-year contract on 13 January 2023.

== Career statistics ==
=== Regular season and playoffs ===
			Regular season					Playoffs
Season	Team	League	GP	G	A	Pts	PIM	GP	G	A	Pts	PIM
2010–11	Karlskrona HK	Div. 1	5	0	0	0	0	4	0	0	0	0
2011–12	Karlskrona HK	Div. 1	36	3	6	9	47	10	1	0	1	12
2012–13	Karlskrona HK	Allsv	23	0	0	0	16	—	—	—	—	—
2012–13	Frölunda HC	J20	15	1	5	6	6	6	1	2	3	8
2013–14	Frölunda HC	J20	45	13	21	34	54	3	0	1	1	8
2013–14	Frölunda HC	SHL	1	0	0	0	4	—	—	—	—	—
2014–15	London Knights	OHL	60	13	29	42	78	10	4	2	6	6
2014–15	Worcester Sharks	AHL	1	0	0	0	2	—	—	—	—	—
2015–16	San Jose Barracuda	AHL	60	3	8	11	40	4	0	0	0	4
2016–17	San Jose Barracuda	AHL	64	3	27	30	40	15	1	7	8	8
2017–18	San Jose Barracuda	AHL	65	10	10	20	57	4	0	1	1	2
2018–19	Belleville Senators	AHL	33	0	6	6	12	—	—	—	—	—
2018–19	Hartford Wolf Pack	AHL	10	0	2	2	2	—	—	—	—	—
2019–20	Frölunda HC	SHL	42	0	6	6	20	—	—	—	—	—
2020–21	Lahti Pelicans	Liiga	57	5	7	12	32	5	0	0	0	2
2021–22	Brynäs IF	SHL	43	3	2	5	8	3	0	0	0	2
2022–23	Brynäs IF	SHL	28	0	0	0	10	—	—	—	—	—
SHL totals			114	3	8	11	42	3	0	0	0	2
AHL totals			233	16	53	69	153	23	1	8	9	14
Liiga totals			57	5	7	12	32	5	0	0	0	2

=== International ===
Year	Team	Event	Result	GP	G	A	Pts	PIM
2012	Sweden	U17	4th	6	0	3	3	6
2012	Sweden	IH18	3rd place, bronze medalist(s)	5	0	1	1	12
2013	Sweden	U18	5th	5	0	1	1	4
2015	Sweden	WJC	4th	7	0	1	1	31
Junior totals				23	0	6	6	53
