= Artyom Blazhiyevsky =

Russian ice hockey player (born 1994)

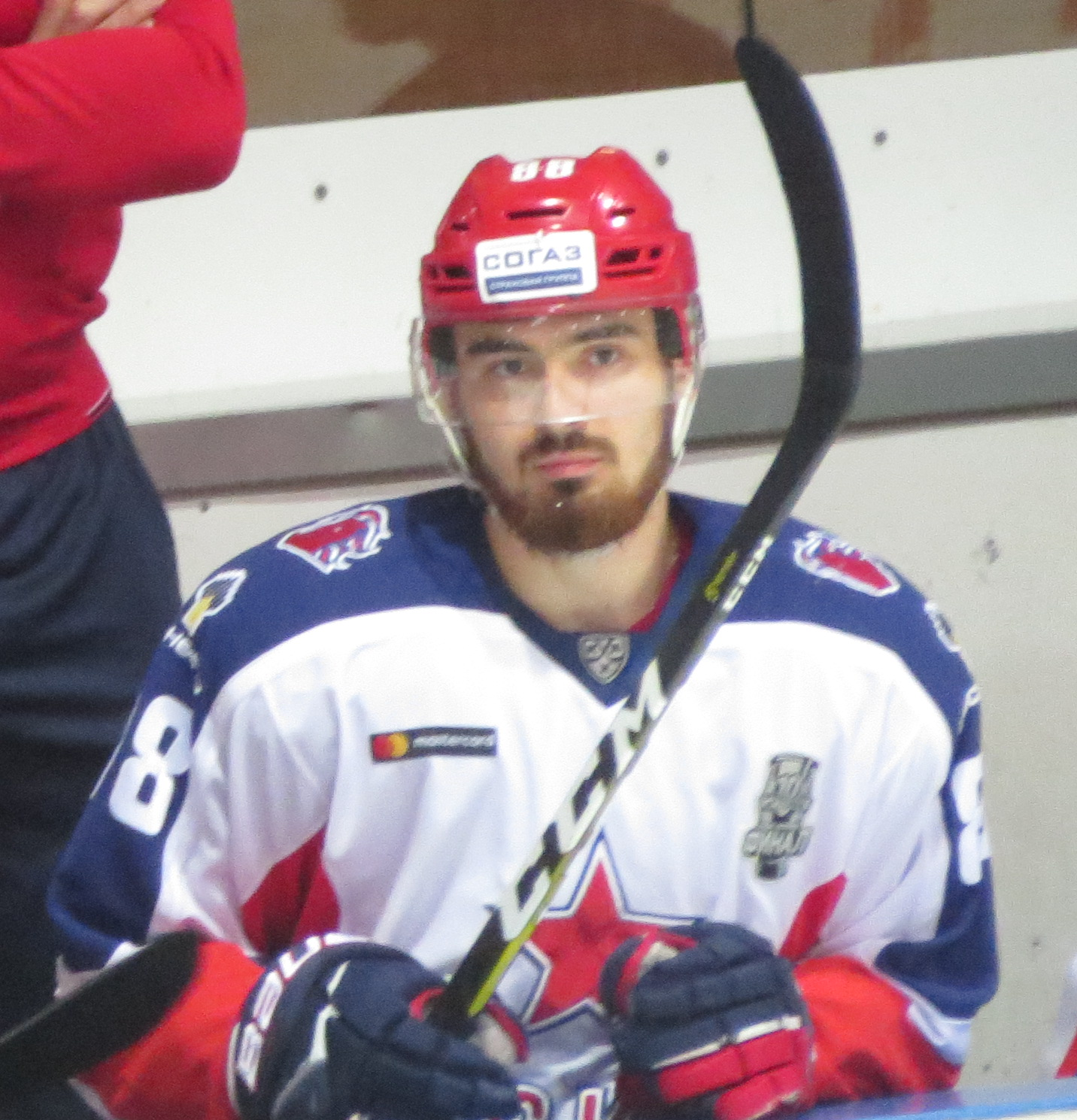
- Blazhiyevsky in 2018
- Born: March 20, 1994 (age 32) Moscow, Russia
- Height: 6 ft 1 in (185 cm)
- Weight: 201 lb (91 kg; 14 st 5 lb)
- Position: Defence
- Shoots: Left
- KHL team Former teams: Dynamo Moscow; Torpedo Nizhny Novgorod; CSKA Moscow; Traktor Chelyabinsk; Avangard Omsk
- Playing career: 2014–present

Artyom Mikhailovich Blazhiyevsky (Russian: Артем Михайлович Блажиевский; born 20 March 1994) is a Russian professional ice hockey defenceman. He is currently playing with HC Dynamo Moscow of the Kontinental Hockey League (KHL).

== Playing career ==
Blazhiyevsky made his Kontinental Hockey League debut playing with Torpedo Nizhny Novgorod during the 2014–15 KHL season.

In the following season he moved to perennial contending club, CSKA Moscow, and later won the Gagarin Cup in the 2018–19 season.

While in his seventh year with CSKA in the 2021–22 season, Blazhiyevsky made 34 appearances, posting 2 goals and 7 points through the mid-point of the campaign. On 27 December 2021, Blazhiyevsky was traded by CSKA Moscow to Traktor Chelyabinsk in exchange for Vitalii Abramov.

After four seasons with Traktor, Blazhiyevsky left as a free agent and was signed to a two-year contract with Avangard Omsk on 19 June 2025.

== Awards and honors ==
Award	Year
KHL
Gagarin Cup (CSKA Moscow)	2019
