= Matt Duchene =

Canadian ice hockey player (born 1991)

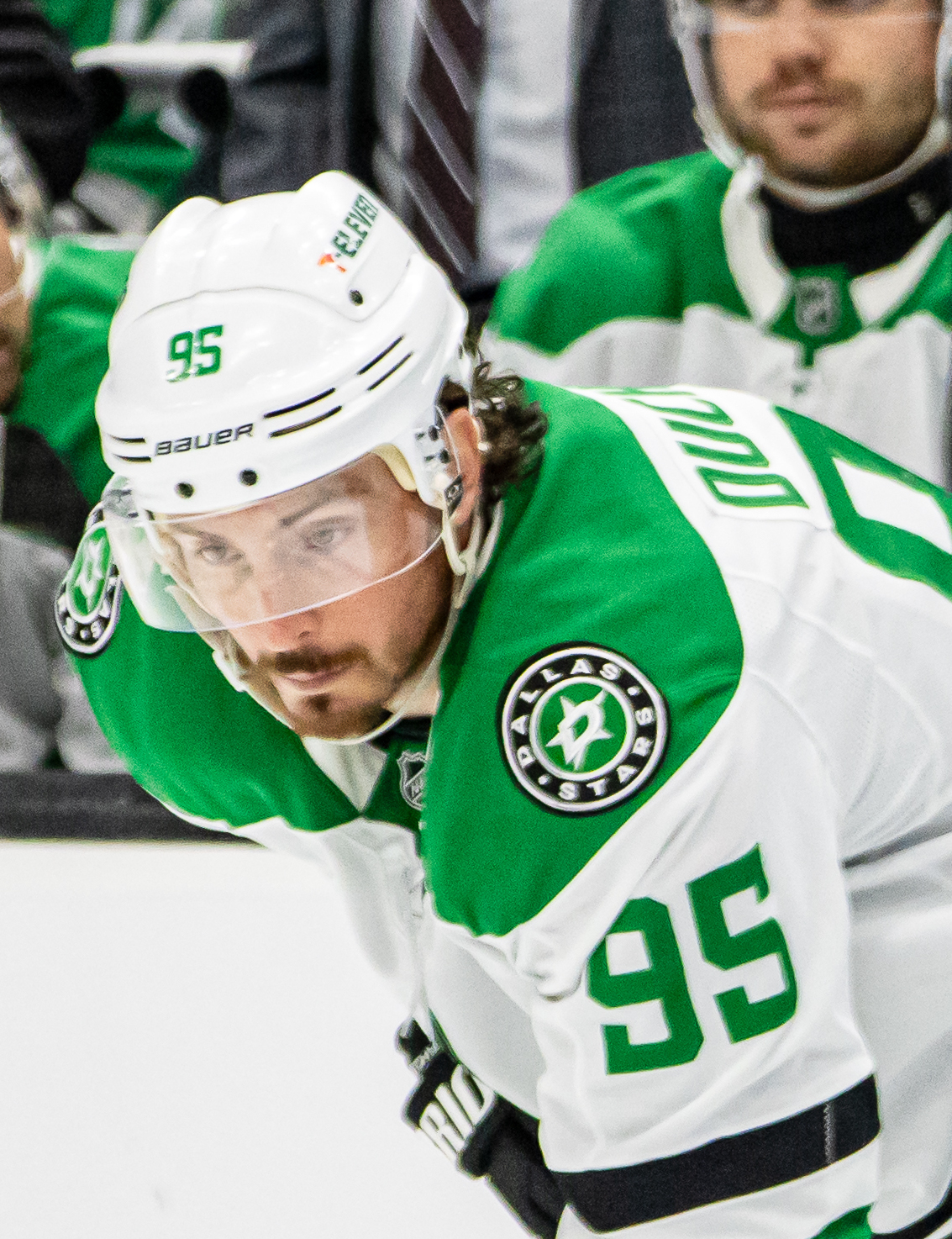
- Duchene with the Dallas Stars in 2025
- Born: January 16, 1991 (age 35) Haliburton, Ontario, Canada
- Height: 5 ft 11 in (180 cm)
- Weight: 211 lb (96 kg; 15 st 1 lb)
- Position: Forward
- Shoots: Left
- NHL team Former teams: Dallas Stars; Colorado Avalanche; Frölunda HC; HC Ambrì-Piotta; Ottawa Senators; Columbus Blue Jackets; Nashville Predators
- National team: Canada
- NHL draft: 3rd overall, 2009; Colorado Avalanche
- Playing career: 2009–present

Matthew David Duchene (pronounced [dyʃɛːn]; born January 16, 1991) is a Canadian professional ice hockey player who is a forward for the Dallas Stars of the National Hockey League (NHL). He has previously played in the NHL for the Colorado Avalanche, Ottawa Senators, Columbus Blue Jackets, and Nashville Predators. While with the Predators, he set a new franchise record for most goals scored in a single season.

Duchene was selected third overall by the Avalanche in the 2009 NHL entry draft. He won a gold medal with Canada at the 2014 Winter Olympics.

== Playing career ==
=== Minor ===
Duchene grew up playing minor hockey for the Ontario Minor Hockey Association (OMHA)'s Central Ontario Wolves (based in Lindsay) of the Eastern AAA League. He also spent his early hockey years playing for his hometown Haliburton Huskies before moving up to the AAA level. In 2006, Duchene verbally stated he was interested in college hockey in the United States and verbally committed to playing in the NCAA. However, after the 2006–07 season with the Wolves, Duchene was selected by the Ontario Hockey League (OHL)'s Brampton Battalion in the first round of the 2007 OHL Priority Selection.

=== Junior ===
Duchene played major junior in the OHL with the Brampton Battalion in 2007–08, scoring 30 goals and 50 points in his rookie campaign. The following season, 2008–09, he improved to 79 points in 57 games, then added 26 points in the playoffs, helping the Battalion to the J. Ross Robertson Cup Finals, where they were defeated by eventual 2009 Memorial Cup champions, the Windsor Spitfires. During his time with the Battalion, Duchene attended Turner Fenton Secondary School.

Entering the 2009 NHL entry draft, Duchene was ranked second overall among North American skaters by the NHL Central Scouting Bureau, behind John Tavares. Swedish defenceman Victor Hedman was also considered a strong candidate with Tavares for the first overall selection. Duchene's well-rounded, two-way game, however, garnered him attention for the top pick as well. After Tavares and Hedman were picked first and second respectively, Duchene was selected third overall by the Colorado Avalanche. Growing up as an Avalanche fan, Duchene quickly became a fan favourite after video footage showed him pumping his fist after Hedman was selected second overall by the Tampa Bay Lightning, effectively sealing his fate as an Avalanche draftee. Having played alongside Vancouver Canucks prospect Cody Hodgson, who had been selected tenth overall the previous year, Duchene sought draft advice from him over the course of the season. While playing in junior, Duchene drew comparisons to such NHLers as Steve Yzerman and Joe Sakic, as well as Mike Richards.

=== Professional ===
==== Colorado Avalanche ====
Duchene recorded his first career NHL point in his Avalanche debut on October 1, 2009, against the San Jose Sharks with an assist on a powerplay goal by John-Michael Liles. Duchene's first goal came later that month on October 17 against Chris Osgood in a 4–3 shootout win over the Detroit Red Wings. The following day, it was announced that Duchene would spend the entire season with the Avalanche instead of being reassigned to the Battalion. On November 30, Duchene compiled his first two-goal NHL game in a 3–0 shutout victory against the Lightning. On December 2, he recorded his second two-goal game and first three-point game in a 6–5 shootout loss to the Florida Panthers. It marked the first time that an 18-year-old recorded back-to-back two-goal games in the NHL since Radek Dvořák did so with Florida in November 1995. Duchene was subsequently selected as the NHL Rookie of the Month for December 2009 after scoring 5 goals and 8 assists for 13 points in 14 games.

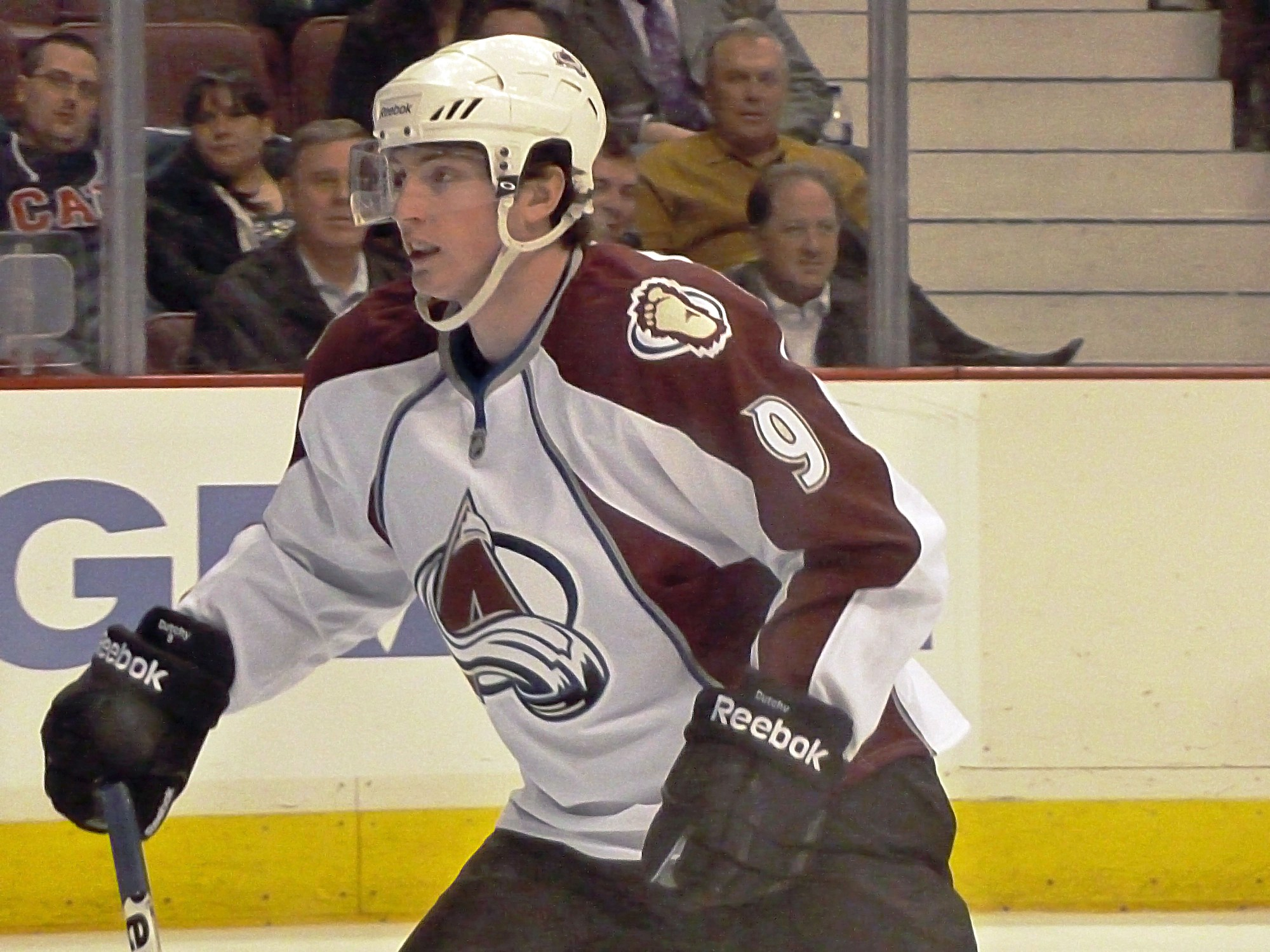
Duchene with the Avalanche in March 2011.

On April 6, 2010, Duchene scored the game-winning shootout goal in a 4–3 win over Vancouver Canucks to clinch the Avalanche a berth in the Stanley Cup playoffs. Duchene finished his rookie season third on the Avalanche in scoring with 55 points, and second in goals with 24. Among NHL rookies, he finished first in points, ahead of Tavares by one, and tied with Tavares for first in goals. Duchene added three assists in six playoff games as the Avalanche were eliminated by San Jose Sharks in the opening round. After completion of the season, he was selected to the NHL All-Rookie team and placed third in Calder Memorial Trophy voting, the award given to the NHL's top rookie of the year.

On November 15, 2010, Duchene got into his first-career fight, facing St. Louis Blues' forward Vladimír Sobotka. In January 2011, he was chosen to participate in his first NHL All-Star Game. During the contest, he became the first player in All-Star Game history to be awarded a penalty shot when Washington Capitals forward Alexander Ovechkin tossed his stick toward Duchene on a breakaway. However, Duchene's attempt was turned away by Henrik Lundqvist of the New York Rangers. Soon thereafter, Duchene recorded his 100th career NHL point on January 26 with a goal against Phoenix Coyotes goaltender Ilya Bryzgalov in a 5–2 loss. Duchene finished the season with 67 points and became the youngest player in Avalanche history to lead the team in scoring.

On November 4, 2011, Duchene tallied his first career hat-trick (and first career four-point game) in a 7–6 overtime loss to the Dallas Stars. Injuries plagued his campaign as he played a mere 58 games.

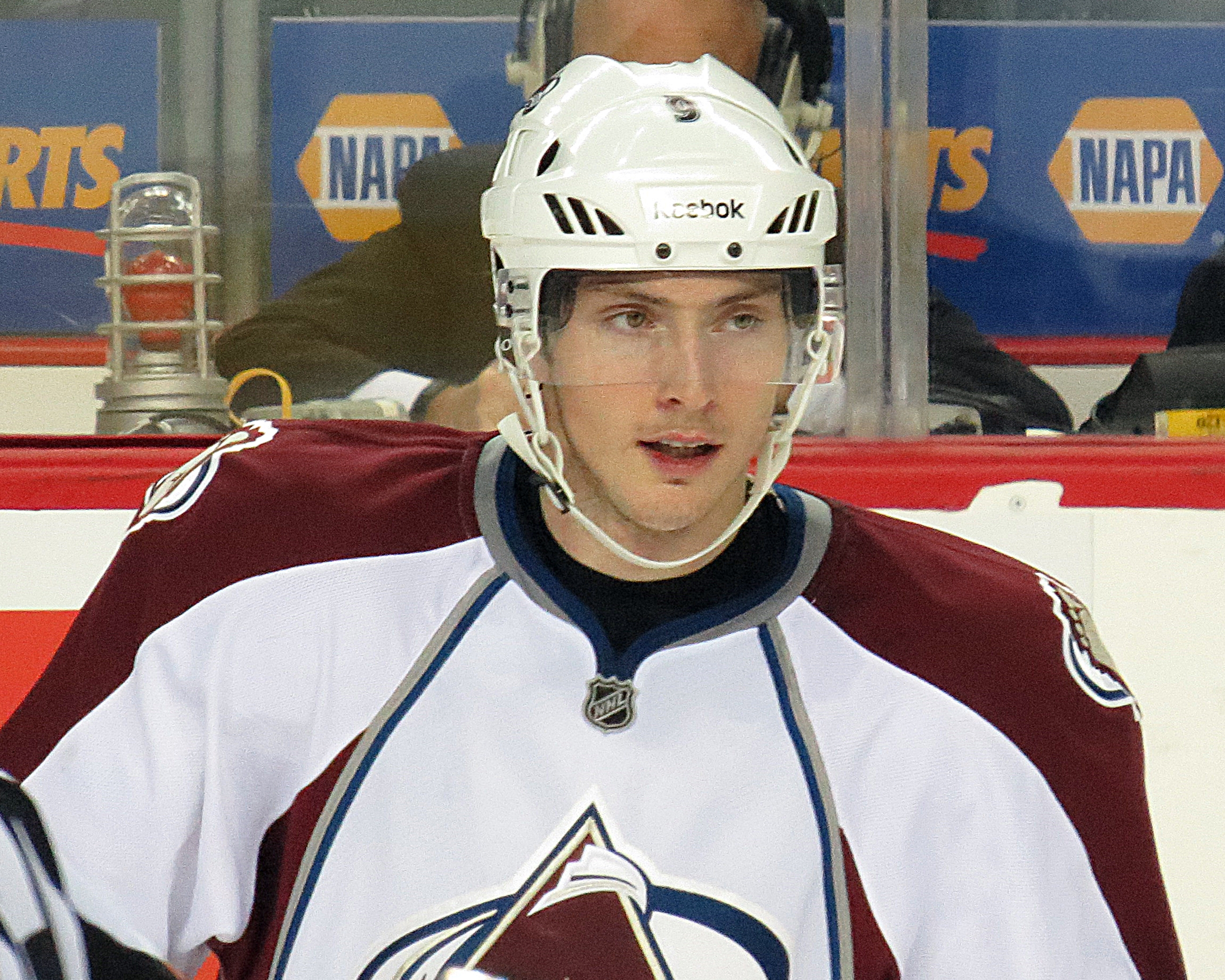
Duchene in December 2013.

On June 23, 2012, Duchene, as a restricted free agent, signed a two-year contract with the Avalanche worth $7 million. However, with the 2012–13 NHL lock-out in effect, Duchene signed an initial two-month contract with Frölunda HC of the Elitserien on October 2, 2012. He made his debut on October 14 in a 4–3 win against Modo Hockey, where he contributed with two assists. Nearing the completion of his contract with Frölunda, it was announced that Duchene's contract would not be extended, and in his final game in Sweden, he scored the game-winning goal in a 3–1 victory over Linköpings HC. He was given a standing ovation after the game and finished with four goals and 14 points in 19 games. The following day, on December 9, 2012, Duchene continued to remain in Europe to sign a one-month contract, with the option for the remainder of the lock-out, with HC Ambrì-Piotta of the Swiss National League A. He appeared in four games, scoring five points over the next month with Ambrì, whose roster was limited by a Spengler Cup selection. After a tentative agreement to end the NHL lock-out was reached, Duchene was farewelled by Ambrì fans on January 7, 2013.

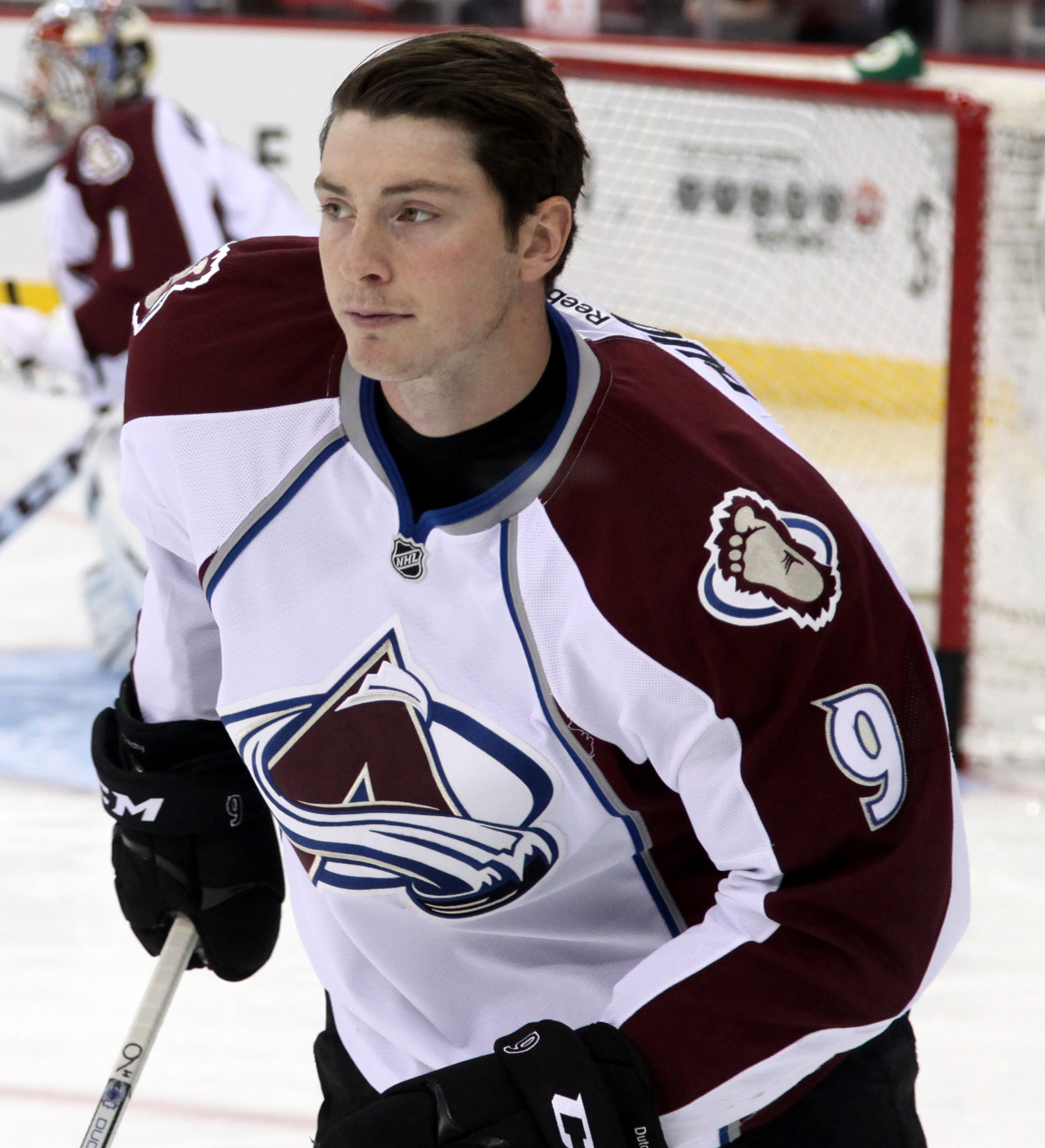
Duchene in 2014.

On July 18, 2013, Duchene signed a new five-year, $30 million contract with Colorado.

The 2013–14 season saw Duchene leading a resurgent Avalanche team to a Central Division title. He went on to lead the team in assists, points and tied Ryan O'Reilly in game-winning goals, with six. On March 31, 2014, the Avalanche announced that Duchene would likely miss four weeks with a knee injury after colliding with teammate Jamie McGinn during a game against the San Jose Sharks. Duchene missed the Avalanche's first five 2014 playoff games as a result of the injury, but came back to play games six and seven, registering three assists. However, the Avalanche lost the Western Conference Quarterfinal series in seven games to the Minnesota Wild.

On October 13, 2016, the Avalanche announced that Duchene would serve as an alternate captain for the 2016–17 season.

==== Ottawa Senators ====
During the 2017–18 season, despite an earlier trade request and prolonged media speculation, Duchene began the season with the Avalanche. On November 5, 2017, Duchene was pulled mid-game in a contest against the New York Islanders and traded to the Ottawa Senators as the Avalanche made a three-team trade with Ottawa and the Nashville Predators. The trade saw the Avalanche acquire Sam Girard, Vladislav Kamenev and a second-round draft pick in the 2018 NHL entry draft from the Predators, as well as Andrew Hammond, Shane Bowers and first- and third-round picks in 2018 from the Senators; the Predators acquired Kyle Turris from the Senators. In 68 games for the Senators, Duchene recorded 23 goals and 26 assists.

Duchene entered the 2018–19 season in the final year of his contract. In 50 games for the Senators, he scored 27 goals and 31 assists.

On October 29, 2018, Duchene was one of multiple Senators players caught on tape in an Uber disparaging their then-assistant coach, Martin Raymond. The Uber driver sold the video to a local newspaper, which published it on November 5. The video quickly went viral, causing a minor scandal. Upon the video's release, Duchene, along with the other players involved, issued a statement apologizing for the comments.

==== Columbus Blue Jackets ====
On February 22, 2019, Duchene was traded (along with Julius Bergman) to the Columbus Blue Jackets for prospects Vitalii Abramov, Jonathan Davidsson, and conditional first-round draft picks in 2019 and 2020. Just two days later, Columbus acquired Duchene's former Senators teammate, Ryan Dzingel. Duchene finished the season with 4 goals and 8 assists in 23 games.

The Blue Jackets qualified for the 2019 playoffs as the Eastern Conference's final wildcard team, upsetting the top-seeded Tampa Bay Lightning in four games before falling to the Boston Bruins in the next round. Duchene finished the playoffs with five goals and five assists in ten games.

==== Nashville Predators ====
On July 1, 2019, Duchene signed a seven-year, $56-million contract with the Nashville Predators, worth an annual average of $8 million. During the 2021–22 season, Duchene set a franchise record for most goals scored in a season.

==== Dallas Stars ====
In the 2023 off-season, after four seasons, the Predators decided to buy out Duchene. Duchene, 32 at the time, had three years left on the seven-year, $56 million contract signed in July 2019. Following his buy out from the Predators, Duchene was promptly signed at the opening of free agency to a one-year, $3 million contract with the Dallas Stars for the 2023–24 season on July 1, 2023.

Duchene played his 1,000th NHL game on December 7, 2023, recording an assist on a Mason Marchment second-period goal as the Stars defeated the Washington Capitals 5–4 in a shootout.

During the playoffs of that season, Duchene recorded the game-winning goal in the second overtime period of the Western Conference Semifinals game six over the Colorado Avalanche, sending the Stars to the Western Conference final.

In 2024–25, Duchene served part of the season as an alternate captain for the Stars due to an injury to Tyler Seguin.

On June 19, 2025, the Dallas Stars announced that they had signed Duchene to a four-year contract extension that runs through the 2028–29 season.

== International play ==
Medal record

Ice hockey

Representing Canada

Olympic Games
Gold medal – first place	2014 Sochi	

World Championships
Gold medal – first place	2015 Czech Republic	
Gold medal – first place	2016 Russia	
Silver medal – second place	2017 Germany/France	

Canada Cup / World Cup
Gold medal – first place	2016 Canada	

IIHF World U18 Championships
Gold medal – first place	2008 Russia	

Duchene made his international debut at the 2008 World U-17 Hockey Challenge. He scored ten points in six games to help Team Ontario to a gold medal. The same year, he was named to Canada's under-18 team for the 2008 IIHF World U18 Championships in April and was selected as captain at the 2008 Ivan Hlinka Memorial Tournament in August; he won gold at both tournaments. Playing in his second major junior season, Duchene participated in Canada's junior camp ahead of the 2009 World Junior Championships, but was ultimately cut from the team's final roster.

Following his rookie season in the NHL, Duchene was named to the senior Canadian team's roster for the 2010 IIHF World Championship in Germany. He made his full international debut, recording a goal and an assist, in a 5–1 preliminary round win against Italy on May 8, 2010. Duchene finished the tournament with four goals for seven points in seven games after Canada was eliminated in the quarter-final by Russia.

Duchene was again added to Canada's World Championship team for the 2011 edition of the tournament following the Avalanche's failure to make the 2011 playoffs. He was unable to repeat his point scoring performance from the previous year, going scoreless in seven games as Canada finished in fifth place.

After signing an NHL lock-out contract in Switzerland with HC Ambrì-Piotta in 2012, Duchene was added to Canada's roster for the annual 2012 Spengler Cup. In four games, Duchene scored five points and was selected as the centre to the All-Star Team in helping his nation win the Spengler Cup for the first time since 2007.

On January 7, 2014, Duchene was named to the Canadian roster for participation at the 2014 Winter Olympics in Sochi. He was initially used as Canada's extra forward or as a healthy scratch in Canada's round robin stage, though after a tournament-ending knee injury to John Tavares suffered in the quarter-finals, Duchene was inserted as the fourth line centre for the tournament semi-final, as well as Canada's gold medal-winning game against Sweden on February 23.

At the 2015 World Championship, where Canada won the gold medal for the first time since 2007 with a perfect 10–0 record, Duchene finished in a tie for third in scoring with four goals and eight assists.

== Personal life ==
Duchene is a committed Christian and is featured on the Breakaway Hockey New Testament by Hockey Ministries International. He is the nephew of Anaheim Ducks assistant coach Newell Brown. He was a die-hard Avalanche fan growing up and had jerseys for Joe Sakic and Patrick Roy, his former general manager and head coach, respectively, with Colorado.

On July 8, 2017, Duchene married his long-time girlfriend, Ashley Grossaint. Their first child, Beau David Newell Duchene, was born on January 9, 2019. Their second child, daughter Jaymes Olivia Duchene, was born on November 9, 2020. They have one other daughter named Ellie.

Duchene announced on February 28, 2024, that he had become a brand ambassador for Can-i Wellness oral spray supplements.

== Career statistics ==
=== Regular season and playoffs ===
			Regular season					Playoffs
Season	Team	League	GP	G	A	Pts	PIM	GP	G	A	Pts	PIM
2006–07	Central Ontario Wolves	ETA U16	52	69	37	106	36	—	—	—	—	—
2007–08	Brampton Battalion	OHL	64	30	20	50	22	5	1	1	2	10
2008–09	Brampton Battalion	OHL	57	31	48	79	42	21	14	12	26	21
2009–10	Colorado Avalanche	NHL	81	24	31	55	16	6	0	3	3	0
2010–11	Colorado Avalanche	NHL	80	27	40	67	33	—	—	—	—	—
2011–12	Colorado Avalanche	NHL	58	14	14	28	8	—	—	—	—	—
2012–13	Frölunda HC	SEL	19	4	10	14	12	—	—	—	—	—
2012–13	HC Ambrì–Piotta	NLA	4	2	3	5	2	—	—	—	—	—
2012–13	Colorado Avalanche	NHL	47	17	26	43	12	—	—	—	—	—
2013–14	Colorado Avalanche	NHL	71	23	47	70	19	2	0	3	3	2
2014–15	Colorado Avalanche	NHL	82	21	34	55	16	—	—	—	—	—
2015–16	Colorado Avalanche	NHL	77	30	29	59	24	—	—	—	—	—
2016–17	Colorado Avalanche	NHL	77	18	23	41	12	—	—	—	—	—
2017–18	Colorado Avalanche	NHL	14	4	6	10	4	—	—	—	—	—
2017–18	Ottawa Senators	NHL	68	23	26	49	14	—	—	—	—	—
2018–19	Ottawa Senators	NHL	50	27	31	58	6	—	—	—	—	—
2018–19	Columbus Blue Jackets	NHL	23	4	8	12	2	10	5	5	10	0
2019–20	Nashville Predators	NHL	66	13	29	42	24	4	1	1	2	2
2020–21	Nashville Predators	NHL	34	6	7	13	6	6	1	2	3	2
2021–22	Nashville Predators	NHL	78	43	43	86	38	4	3	1	4	0
2022–23	Nashville Predators	NHL	71	22	34	56	32	—	—	—	—	—
2023–24	Dallas Stars	NHL	80	25	40	65	20	19	2	4	6	6
2024–25	Dallas Stars	NHL	82	30	52	82	12	18	1	5	6	6
2025–26	Dallas Stars	NHL	57	16	29	45	8	6	2	7	9	4
NHL totals			1,195	387	549	936	306	75	15	31	46	22

=== International ===
Year	Team	Event	Result	GP	G	A	Pts	PIM
2008	Canada Ontario	U17	1st place, gold medalist(s)	6	4	6	10	8
2008	Canada	WJC18	1st place, gold medalist(s)	7	5	3	8	6
2008	Canada	IH18	1st place, gold medalist(s)	4	1	3	4	4
2010	Canada	WC	7th	7	4	3	7	0
2011	Canada	WC	5th	7	0	0	0	2
2012	Canada	SC	1st place, gold medalist(s)	4	2	3	5	0
2013	Canada	WC	5th	8	4	1	5	0
2014	Canada	OG	1st place, gold medalist(s)	4	0	0	0	0
2015	Canada	WC	1st place, gold medalist(s)	10	4	8	12	2
2016	Canada	WC	1st place, gold medalist(s)	10	5	5	10	2
2016	Canada	WCH	1st place, gold medalist(s)	7	2	2	4	2
2017	Canada	WC	2nd place, silver medalist(s)	10	1	0	1	0
Junior totals				17	10	12	22	18
Senior totals				66	22	22	44	8

== Awards and honours ==
Award	Year
OHL
Bobby Smith Trophy	2009
NHL
All-Rookie team	2010
All-Star Game	2011, 2016
International
Spengler Cup All-Star Team	2012

Awards and achievements
Preceded by Kevin Shattenkirk	Colorado Avalanche first-round draft pick 2009	Succeeded by Joey Hishon
