= Jonathan Davidsson =

Swedish ice hockey player (born 1997)

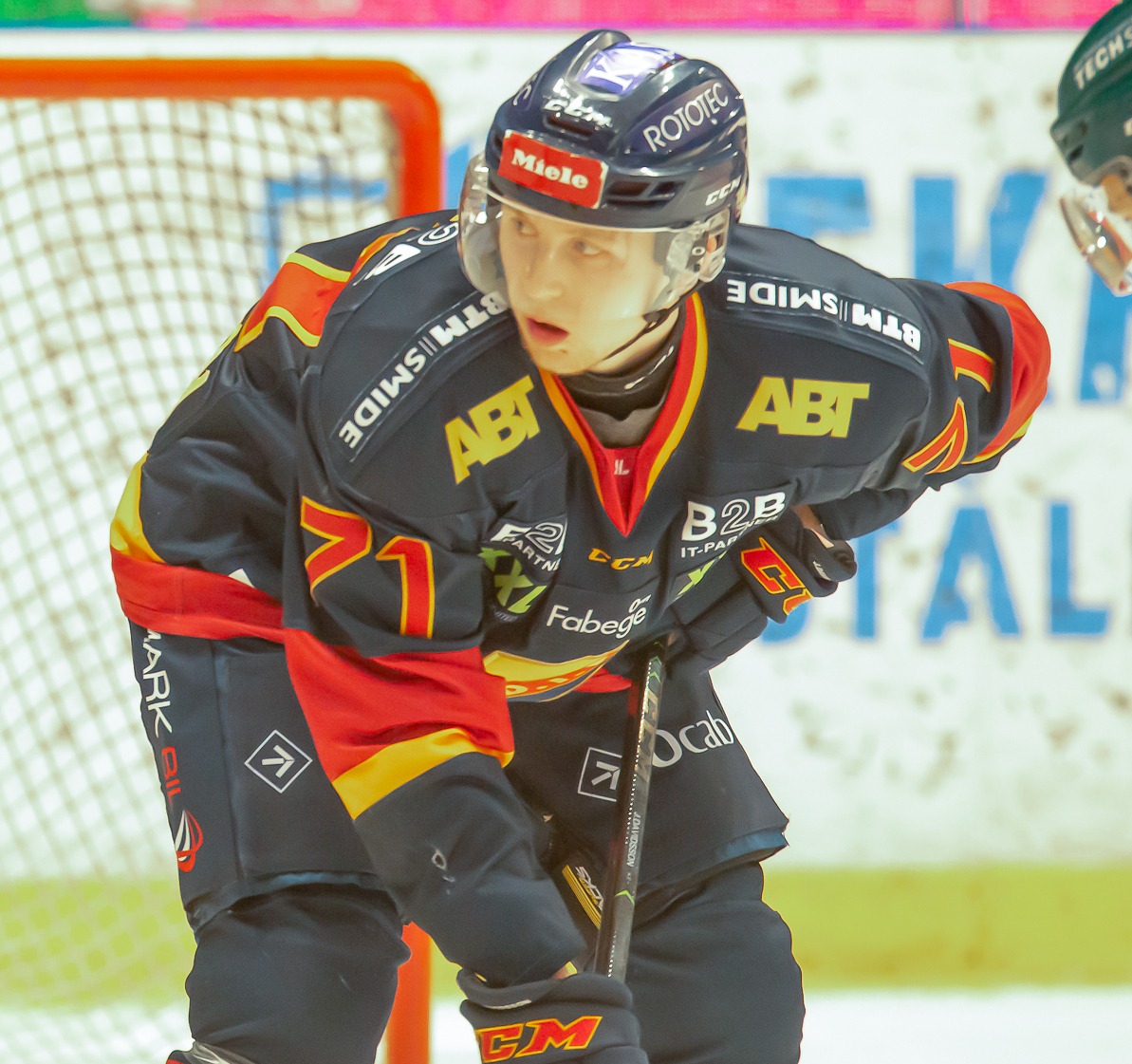
- Jonathan Davidsson in 2019
- Born: 12 March 1997 (age 29) Tyresö, Sweden
- Height: 180 cm (5 ft 11 in)
- Weight: 84 kg (185 lb; 13 st 3 lb)
- Position: Right wing
- Shoots: Right
- SHL team Former teams: Skellefteå AIK; Djurgårdens IF; Ottawa Senators; HV71; Tappara; Ässät
- NHL draft: 170th overall, 2017; Columbus Blue Jackets
- Playing career: 2015–present

Jonathan Davidsson (born 12 March 1997) is a Swedish professional ice hockey forward for Skellefteå AIK of the Swedish Hockey League (SHL). Davidsson was drafted in the sixth round, 170th overall, of the 2017 NHL entry draft by the Columbus Blue Jackets and traded to the Ottawa Senators in February 2019.

== Playing career ==
Davidsson made his Swedish Hockey League debut playing with Djurgårdens IF Hockey during the 2015–16 SHL season. Davidsson also played for HockeyAllsvenskan team Asplöven HC on loan during the 2015–16 season. Jonathan's younger brother Marcus played together with Jonathan for Djurgårdens IF. Davidsson, along with his younger brother, extended his contract with Djurgården for an additional season in February 2018.

On 5 May 2018, Davidsson signed a three-year, entry-level contract with the Columbus Blue Jackets. After attending the Blue Jackets 2018 training camp, Davidsson was loaned by the Blue Jackets to return to Sweden and continue his development with Djurgårdens IF for the duration of the 2018–19 season.

On 22 February 2019, Davidsson was traded to the Ottawa Senators as part of the Blue Jackets acquisition of Senators forward Matt Duchene. Davidsson played his first game in the NHL on 7 November 2019, against the Los Angeles Kings.

After two seasons within the Senators organization, Davidsson as an impending restricted free agent opted to return to Sweden, signing a one-year contract along with his brother Marcus, to play with HV71 on 22 June 2021.

After helping HV71 return to the SHL, Davidsson registered 2 points through 23 games in the 2022–23 season before he left the club, alongside Marcus in signing for the remainder of the season with Tappara of the Finnish SM-liiga on 18 December 2022.

Along with his brother, Davidsson signed a one-year contract with Porin Ässät of the SM-liiga for the 2023–24 season. Before the start of the regular season, Davidsson suffered an injury when a puck broke his jaw. After healing from the surgery, Jonathan was back on the ice on 28 October, missing 15 games.

== Career statistics ==
=== Regular season and playoffs ===
			Regular season					Playoffs
Season	Team	League	GP	G	A	Pts	PIM	GP	G	A	Pts	PIM
2012–13	Djurgårdens IF	J20	1	0	0	0	0	—	—	—	—	—
2013–14	Djurgårdens IF	J20	11	1	0	1	12	—	—	—	—	—
2014–15	Djurgårdens IF	J20	39	17	28	45	18	5	0	2	2	0
2015–16	Djurgårdens IF	J20	27	9	28	37	34	7	4	5	9	0
2015–16	Djurgårdens IF	SHL	12	0	0	0	2	—	—	—	—	—
2015–16	Asplöven HC	Allsv	9	0	0	0	2	—	—	—	—	—
2016–17	Djurgårdens IF	J20	11	5	7	12	0	1	1	0	1	2
2016–17	Djurgårdens IF	SHL	44	3	9	12	16	2	0	0	0	0
2017–18	Djurgårdens IF	SHL	52	10	21	31	12	11	4	4	8	6
2018–19	Djurgårdens IF	SHL	37	10	11	21	18	—	—	—	—	—
2019–20	Belleville Senators	AHL	18	2	3	5	6	—	—	—	—	—
2019–20	Ottawa Senators	NHL	6	0	1	1	0	—	—	—	—	—
2020–21	Västerviks IK	Allsv	10	1	3	4	8	—	—	—	—	—
2020–21	Belleville Senators	AHL	12	0	0	0	2	—	—	—	—	—
2021–22	HV71	Allsv	45	13	8	21	16	15	1	4	5	0
2022–23	HV71	SHL	23	0	2	2	2	—	—	—	—	—
2022–23	Tappara	Liiga	25	5	7	12	10	14	1	2	3	0
2023–24	Ässät	Liiga	29	3	6	9	8	—	—	—	—	—
2024–25	Skellefteå AIK	SHL	44	3	5	8	4	11	2	1	3	29
SHL totals			212	26	48	74	54	24	6	5	11	35
NHL totals			6	0	1	1	0	—	—	—	—	—

=== International ===
Year	Team	Event	Result	GP	G	A	Pts	PIM
2014	Sweden	U17	6th	5	0	1	1	2
2014	Sweden	IH18	4th	5	2	1	3	4
2015	Sweden	U18	8th	5	0	1	1	0
Junior totals				15	2	3	5	6
