= 2013 Calder Cup playoffs =

Ice hockey league playoff competition

Tournament details
- Dates: April 26 – June 18, 2013
- Teams: 16
- Defending champions: Norfolk Adrmials (did not qualify)

Final positions
- Champions: Grand Rapids Griffins
- Runners-up: Syracuse Crunch

Tournament statistics
- Scoring leader(s): Ondrej Palat (Crunch) (26 points)

Awards
- MVP: Tomas Tatar (Griffins)

The 2013 Calder Cup playoffs of the American Hockey League began on April 26, 2013, with the same playoff format that was introduced in 2012. The sixteen teams that qualified, eight from each conference, played a best-of-five series in the conference quarterfinals, and the playoffs continued with best-of-seven series for the conference semifinals, conference finals and Calder Cup finals. The Grand Rapids Griffins defeated the Syracuse Crunch in six games to win the Calder Cup for the first time in Grand Rapids' franchise history.

== Playoff seeds ==
After the 2012–13 AHL regular season, 16 teams qualified for the playoffs. The top eight teams from each conference qualifies for the playoffs.

=== Eastern Conference ===
==== Atlantic Division ====
1. Providence Bruins – 105 points
2. Portland Pirates – 87 points
3. Manchester Monarchs – 81 points (35 regulation and overtime wins)

==== Northeast Division ====
1. Springfield Falcons – 99 points

==== East Division ====
1. Syracuse Crunch – 97 points
2. Binghamton Senators – 96 points
3. Wilkes-Barre/Scranton Penguins – 88 points
4. Hershey Bears – 81 points (32 regulation and overtime wins)

=== Western Conference ===
==== North Division ====
1. Toronto Marlies – 96 points
2. Rochester Americans – 90 points (33 regulation and overtime wins)

==== Midwest Division ====
1. Grand Rapids Griffins – 92 points
2. Milwaukee Admirals – 89 points

==== South Division ====
1. Texas Stars – 97 points
2. Charlotte Checkers – 92 points
3. Oklahoma City Barons – 91 points
4. Houston Aeros – 90 points (35 regulation and overtime wins)

== Bracket ==
Conference quarterfinals	Conference semifinals
1	Providence	3
8	Hershey	2
1	Providence	3
5	Wilkes-Barre/Scranton	4
2	Springfield	3
7	Manchester	1
Eastern Conference
3	Syracuse	3
6	Portland	0
2	Springfield	0
3	Syracuse	4
4	Binghamton	0
5	Wilkes-Barre/Scranton	3
1	Texas	3
8	Milwaukee	1
1	Texas	1
5	Oklahoma City	4
2	Toronto	3
7	Rochester	0
Western Conference
3	Grand Rapids	3
6	Houston	2
2	Toronto	2
3	Grand Rapids	4
4	Charlotte	2
5	Oklahoma City	3

Conference finals
5	Wilkes-Barre/Scranton	1
3	Syracuse	4
5	Oklahoma City	3
3	Grand Rapids	4

Calder Cup Final
E3	Syracuse	2
W3	Grand Rapids	4

== Conference quarterfinals ==
Note: Home team is listed first.

=== Eastern Conference ===
==== (1) Providence Bruins vs. (8) Hershey Bears ====
April 26	Providence Bruins	2 – 5	Hershey Bears	Dunkin' Donuts Center	Recap
No scoring		First period	13:37 – pp – Joey Crabb 1
Jamie Tardif 1 – 13:56		Second period	4:43 – pp – Casey Wellman 1; 5:22 – pp – Jon DiSalvatore 1; 9:23 – Dmitri Orlov 1
Christian Hanson 1 – 3:54		Third period	19:53 – en, sh – Michael Latta 1
Niklas Svedberg 19 saves / 23 shots Michael Hutchinson 11 saves / 11 shots		Goalie stats	Philipp Grubauer 31 saves / 33 shots

April 28	Providence Bruins	4 – 5	OT	Hershey Bears	Dunkin' Donuts Center	Recap
Graham Mink 1 – 9:05		First period		3:14 – Ryan Stoa 1; 14:56 – pp – Nicolas Deschamps 1
Carter Camper 1 – 1:09; Chris Bourque 1 – 10:54		Second period		10:33 – Garrett Mitchell 1
Graham Mink 2 – pp – 13:18		Third period		18:31 – Joey Crabb 2
No scoring		First overtime period		3:05 – pp – Jon DiSalvatore 2
Niklas Svedberg 24 saves / 29 shots		Goalie stats		Philipp Grubauer 54 saves / 58 shots

May 4	Hershey Bears	1 – 5	Providence Bruins	Giant Center	Recap
Michael Latta 2 – 3:44		First period	8:11 – Chris Bourque 2
No scoring		Second period	3:06 – Bobby Robins 1; 10:19 – pp – Jamie Tardif 2
No scoring		Third period	4:07 – Chris Bourque 3; 8:02 – pp – Carter Camper 2
Philipp Grubauer 22 saves / 27 shots		Goalie stats	Niklas Svedberg 30 saves / 31 shots

May 5	Hershey Bears	4 – 5	Providence Bruins	Giant Center	Recap
No scoring		First period	8:01 – Carter Camper 3; 12:10 – pp – Graham Mink 3
Joey Crabb 3 – pp – 1:58		Second period	No scoring
Joey Crabb 4 – 3:42; Casey Wellman 2 – 11:45; Tom Wilson 1 – 15:20		Third period	8:10 – Carter Camper 4; 17:26 – pp – Craig Cunningham 1; 18:56 – Carter Camper 5
Philipp Grubauer 32 saves / 37 shots		Goalie stats	Niklas Svedberg 28 saves / 32 shots

May 8	Providence Bruins	3 – 2	Hershey Bears	Dunkin' Donuts Center	Recap
Justin Florek 1 – 5:04		First period	1:19 – Casey Wellman 3
Jordan Caron 1 – 15:08		Second period	No scoring
Jamie Tardif 3 – 9:20		Third period	3:56 – Joey Crabb 5
Niklas Svedberg 24 saves / 26 shots		Goalie stats	Philipp Grubauer 34 saves / 37 shots

Providence wins series 3–2

==== (2) Springfield Falcons vs. (7) Manchester Monarchs ====
April 27	Springfield Falcons	2 – 1	OT	Manchester Monarchs	MassMutual Center	Recap
No scoring		First period		No scoring
Blake Parlett 1 – ps – 10:25		Second period		No scoring
No scoring		Third period		11:11 – Brian O'Neill 1
Cody Bass 1 – 10:36		First overtime period		No scoring
Curtis McElhinney 29 saves / 30 shots		Goalie stats		Martin Jones 33 saves / 35 shots

April 28	Springfield Falcons	3 – 2	OT	Manchester Monarchs	MassMutual Center	Recap
Trent Vogelhuber 1 – sh – 2:49		First period		7:10 – pp – Nicolas Deslauriers 1
No scoring		Second period		15:52 – Anthony Stewart 1
David Savard 1 – pp – 7:11		Third period		No scoring
Cody Bass 2 – 18:44		First overtime period		No scoring
Curtis McElhinney 41 saves / 43 shots		Goalie stats		Martin Jones 35 saves / 38 shots

May 2	Manchester Monarchs	2 – 1	Springfield Falcons	Verizon Wireless Arena	Recap
Nicolas Deslauriers 2 – pp – 4:49		First period	7:11 – pp – David Savard 2
David Meckler 1 – pp – 15:30		Second period	No scoring
No scoring		Third period	No scoring
Martin Jones 32 saves / 33 shots		Goalie stats	Curtis McElhinney 26 saves / 28 shots

May 4	Manchester Monarchs	3 – 4	OT	Springfield Falcons	Verizon Wireless Arena	Recap
Colton Yellow Horn 1 – 8:33; Linden Vey 1 – 10:27		First period		1:40 – Blake Parlett 2
Linden Vey 2 – 5:17		Second period		13:35 – Boone Jenner 1; 18:24 – Michael Chaput 1
No scoring		Third period		No scoring
No scoring		First overtime period		8:06 – Nicholas Drazenovic 1
Martin Jones 37 saves / 41 shots		Goalie stats		Curtis McElhinney 37 saves / 40 shots

Springfield wins series 3–1

==== (3) Syracuse Crunch vs. (6) Portland Pirates ====
April 27	Syracuse Crunch	4 – 3	OT	Portland Pirates	Oncenter War Memorial Arena	Recap
No scoring		First period		10:53 – Darian Dziurzynski 1; 17:16 – pp – David Rundblad 1
Tyler Johnson 1 – pp – 6:37; Mark Barberio 1 – pp – 13:32		Second period		8:23 – Chris Brown 1
Dan Sexton 1 – 7:54		Third period		No scoring
Richard Panik 1 – pp – 6:36		First overtime period		No scoring
Cedrick Desjardins 28 saves / 31 shots		Goalie stats		Chad Johnson 35 saves / 39 shots

April 28	Syracuse Crunch	4 – 2	Portland Pirates	Oncenter War Memorial Arena	Recap
Ondrej Palat 1 – 9:33; J. T. Brown 1 – 10:41		First period	No scoring
Tyler Johnson 2 – sh – 0:49; Brett Connolly 1 – 14:36		Second period	16:50 – Brandon Gormley 1
No scoring		Third period	9:40 – Nick Johnson 1
Cedrick Desjardins 18 saves / 20 shots		Goalie stats	Chad Johnson 30 saves / 34 shots

May 2	Portland Pirates	3 – 4	OT	Syracuse Crunch	Cumberland County Civic Center	Recap
Andy Miele 1 – pp – 15:57		First period		No scoring
No scoring		Second period		6:57 – pp – Radko Gudas 1
Alexandre Bolduc 1 – 0:19; Nick Johnson 2 – pp – 10:47		Third period		13:59 – Mike Angelidis 1; 18:48 – Ondrej Palat 2
No scoring		First overtime period		19:43 – Ondrej Palat 3
Chad Johnson 41 saves / 45 shots		Goalie stats		Cedrick Desjardins 15 saves / 18 shots

Syracuse wins series 3–0

==== (4) Binghamton Senators vs. (5) Wilkes-Barre/Scranton Penguins ====
April 27	Binghamton Senators	2 – 3	OT	Wilkes-Barre/Scranton Penguins	Broome County Veterans Memorial Arena	Recap
Shane Prince 1 – pp – 19:12		First period		10:58 – pp – Brian Gibbons 1; 16:41 – Chad Kolarik 1
Mark Stone 1 – 17:03		Second period		No scoring
No scoring		Third period		No scoring
No scoring		First overtime period		8:18 – Chad Kolarik 2
Nathan Lawson 30 saves / 33 shots		Goalie stats		Jeff Zatkoff 34 saves / 36 shots

April 28	Binghamton Senators	2 – 3	Wilkes-Barre/Scranton Penguins	Broome County Veterans Memorial Arena	Recap
Matt Puempel 1 – 14:35		First period	2:48 – pp – Riley Holzapfel 1
No scoring		Second period	12:03 – Chris Collins 1; 19:58 – Warren Peters 1
Chris Wideman 1 – pp – 19:41		Third period	No scoring
Nathan Lawson 21 saves / 24 shots		Goalie stats	Jeff Zatkoff 35 saves / 37 shots

May 2	Wilkes-Barre/Scranton Penguins	3 – 2	Binghamton Senators	Mohegan Sun Arena at Casey Plaza	Recap
No scoring		First period	5:00 – Matt Puempel 2
No scoring		Second period	No scoring
Zach Sill 1 – sh – 7:32; Riley Holzapfel 2 – pp – 18:42; Jayson Megna 1 – en – 19:32		Third period	19:58 – Mark Borowiecki 1
Brad Thiessen 35 saves / 37 shots		Goalie stats	Nathan Lawson 25 saves / 27 shots

Wilkes-Barre/Scranton wins series 3–0

=== Western Conference ===
==== (1) Texas Stars vs. (8) Milwaukee Admirals ====
April 26	Milwaukee Admirals	2 – 3	OT	Texas Stars	BMO Harris Bradley Center	Recap
Patrick Cehlin 1 – pp – 12:15		First period		19:44 – Matt Fraser 1
No scoring		Second period		9:09 – pp – Kevin Connauton 1
Zach Hamill 1 – pp – 7:11		Third period		No scoring
No scoring		First overtime period		11:44 – Brett Ritchie 1
Magnus Hellberg 41 saves / 44 shots		Goalie stats		Cristopher Nihlstorp 29 saves / 31 shots

April 27	Milwaukee Admirals	2 – 0	Texas Stars	BMO Harris Bradley Center	Recap
No scoring		First period	No scoring
Austin Watson 1 – 12:04		Second period	No scoring
Mike Moore 1 – en – 19:31		Third period	No scoring
Magnus Hellberg 23 saves / 23 shots		Goalie stats	Cristopher Nihlstorp 19 saves / 20 shots

May 1	Texas Stars	2 – 0	Milwaukee Admirals	Cedar Park Center	Recap
No scoring		First period	No scoring
No scoring		Second period	No scoring
Alex Chiasson 1 – 7:42; Kevin Connauton 2 – pp – 13:57		Third period	No scoring
Cristopher Nihlstorp 21 saves / 21 shots		Goalie stats	Magnus Hellberg 29 saves / 31 shots

May 3	Texas Stars	2 – 1	Milwaukee Admirals	Cedar Park Center	Recap
Matt Fraser 2 – 10:16		First period	No scoring
Alex Chiasson 2 – 1:29		Second period	No scoring
No scoring		Third period	1:40 – Kevin Henderson 1
Cristopher Nihlstorp 34 saves / 35 shots		Goalie stats	Magnus Hellberg 24 saves / 26 shots

Texas wins series 3–1

==== (2) Toronto Marlies vs. (7) Rochester Americans ====
April 27	Toronto Marlies	6 – 3	Rochester Americans	Ricoh Coliseum	Recap
Greg Scott 1 – 12:04; Greg Scott 2 – pp – 17:49		First period	18:46 – Zemgus Girgensons 1
Greg McKegg 1 – pp – 2:48		Second period	1:12 – sh – Cody McCormick 1; 15:34 – Zemgus Girgensons 2
Paul Ranger 1 – 5:14; Greg Scott 3 – 15:22; Greg Scott 4 – en, pp – 18:22		Third period	No scoring
Drew MacIntyre 31 saves / 34 shots		Goalie stats	David Leggio 12 saves / 17 shots

April 28	Toronto Marlies	2 – 0	Rochester Americans	Ricoh Coliseum	Recap
No scoring		First period	No scoring
Michael Zigomanis 1 – pp – 12:39		Second period	No scoring
Jerry D'Amigo 1 – 1:45		Third period	No scoring
Drew MacIntyre 25 saves / 25 shots		Goalie stats	Matt Hackett 18 saves / 20 shots

May 1	Rochester Americans	2 – 3	OT	Toronto Marlies	Blue Cross Arena at the War Memorial	Recap
No scoring		First period		No scoring
Zemgus Girgensons 3 – 14:20		Second period		6:19 – sh – Greg Scott 5; 19:18 – Greg McKegg 2
Nick Tarnasky 1 – 15:57		Third period		No scoring
No scoring		First overtime period		5:14 – Will Acton 1
David Leggio 27 saves / 30 shots		Goalie stats		Drew MacIntyre 37 saves / 39 shots

Toronto wins series 3–0

==== (3) Grand Rapids Griffins vs. (6) Houston Aeros ====
April 26	Houston Aeros	3 – 0	Grand Rapids Griffins	Toyota Center	Recap
No scoring		First period	No scoring
Marco Scandella 1 – pp – 11:55; Justin Fontaine 1 – 16:52		Second period	No scoring
Justin Fontaine 2 – en – 18:14		Third period	No scoring
Darcy Kuemper 36 saves / 36 shots		Goalie stats	Petr Mrazek 27 saves / 29 shots

April 28	Houston Aeros	2 – 3	Grand Rapids Griffins	Toyota Center	Recap
No scoring		First period	4:16 – Tomas Tatar 1
No scoring		Second period	11:02 – pp – Tomas Jurco 1
Justin Fontaine 3 – pp – 15:33; Brian Connelly 1 – 19:47		Third period	14:06 – Tomas Jurco 2
Darcy Kuemper 31 saves / 34 shots		Goalie stats	Petr Mrazek 19 saves / 21 shots

May 1	Grand Rapids Griffins	4 – 2	Houston Aeros	Van Andel Arena	Recap
No scoring		First period	19:51 – Erik Haula 1
Jeff Hoggan 1 – pp – 5:30; Teemu Pulkkinen 1 – 12:42		Second period	14:02 – David McIntyre 1
Adam Almqvist 1 – 16:22; Luke Glendening 1 – en – 19:46		Third period	No scoring
Petr Mrazek 25 saves / 27 shots		Goalie stats	Mike Condon 35 saves / 38 shots

May 3	Grand Rapids Griffins	1 – 4	Houston Aeros	Van Andel Arena	Recap
Luke Glendening 2 – sh – 4:44		First period	12:24 – pp – Mikael Granlund 1; 19:31 – Chad Rau 1
No scoring		Second period	10:35 – pp – Steven Kampfer 1
No scoring		Third period	17:55 – en – David McIntyre 2
Petr Mrazek 15 saves / 18 shots		Goalie stats	Mike Condon 41 saves / 42 shots

May 4	Grand Rapids Griffins	7 – 0	Houston Aeros	Van Andel Arena	Recap
Francis Pare 1 – 12:03		First period	No scoring
Tomas Tatar 2 – 4:25; Riley Sheahan 1 – 8:56; Jan Mursak 1 – 13:52; Tomas Tatar 3 – 19:53		Second period	No scoring
Adam Almqvist 2 – pp – 4:06; Teemu Pulkkinen 2 – 17:25		Third period	No scoring
Petr Mrazek 24 saves / 24 shots		Goalie stats	Mike Condon 34 saves / 41 shots

Grand Rapids wins series 3–2

==== (4) Charlotte Checkers vs. (5) Oklahoma City Barons ====
April 26	Oklahoma City Barons	3 – 4	OT	Charlotte Checkers	Cox Convention Center	Recap
Teemu Hartikainen 1 – 7:38		First period		No scoring
C. J. Stretch 1 – pp – 18:24; Josh Green 1 – 18:45		Second period		2:28 – pp – Justin Shugg 1; 11:17 – Brody Sutter 1
No scoring		Third period		2:32 – pp – Zach Boychuk 1
No scoring		First overtime period		3:06 – Brody Sutter 2
Yann Danis 24 saves / 28 shots		Goalie stats		Rob Madore 30 saves / 33 shots

April 27	Oklahoma City Barons	5 – 2	Charlotte Checkers	Cox Convention Center	Recap
Jonathan Cheechoo 1 – 16:52		First period	9:35 – Sean Dolan 1; 11:07 – Zach Boychuk 2
Randy Jones 1 – 18:30		Second period	No scoring
Mark Arcobello 1 – 8:44; Mark Arcobello 2 – 17:23; Mark Arcobello 3 – en – 18:17		Third period	No scoring
Yann Danis 33 saves / 35 shots		Goalie stats	Rob Madore 26 saves / 30 shots

May 1	Charlotte Checkers	6 – 1	Oklahoma City Barons	Time Warner Cable Arena	Recap
Matt Marquardt 1 – 2:32; Chris Terry 1 – pp – 6:50; Chris Terry 2 – pp – 8:18		First period	19:09 – pp – Toni Rajala 1
Tim Wallace 1 – 11:34		Second period	No scoring
Bobby Raymond 1 – pp – 14:08; Justin Shugg 2 – 16:12		Third period	No scoring
Rob Madore 37 saves / 38 shots		Goalie stats	Yann Danis 27 saves / 33 shots

May 3	Charlotte Checkers	1 – 8	Oklahoma City Barons	Time Warner Cable Arena	Recap
No scoring		First period	0:34 – Philippe Cornet 1; 10:23 – Tyler Pitlick 1; 15:57 – Chris VandeVelde 1
No scoring		Second period	5:27 – pp – Josh Green 2; 8:29 – Anton Lander 1; 11:11 – pp – Martin Marincin 1
Zach Boychuk 3 – 3:52		Third period	9:08 – pp – Tyler Pitlick 2; 9:48 – Teemu Hartikainen 2
Rob Madore 13 saves / 17 shots Mike Murphy 16 saves / 20 shots		Goalie stats	Yann Danis 24 saves / 25 shots

May 4	Charlotte Checkers	2 – 6	Oklahoma City Barons	Time Warner Cable Arena	Recap
Riley Nash 1 – 10:56; Bobby Raymond 2 – 17:37		First period	13:30 – Jonathan Cheechoo 2; 14:10 – Anton Lander 2
No scoring		Second period	9:57 – Teemu Hartikainen 3; 11:35 – Josh Green 3; 16:07 – Toni Rajala 2
No scoring		Third period	18:34 – en – Andrew Hotham 1
Rob Madore 13 saves / 17 shots John Muse 11 saves / 12 shots		Goalie stats	Yann Danis 49 saves / 51 shots

Oklahoma City wins series 3–2

== Conference semifinals ==
=== Eastern Conference ===
==== (1) Providence Bruins vs. (5) Wilkes-Barre/Scranton Penguins ====
The Penguins became the third team in AHL history, along with the 1960 Rochester Americans and 1989 Adirondack Red Wings to come back from a 0–3 series deficit and win a best of seven playoff series, and the first team to then win Game 7 on the road.

May 10	Providence Bruins	8 – 5	Wilkes-Barre/Scranton Penguins	Dunkin' Donuts Center	Recap
Ryan Spooner 1 – 18:54		First period	9:31 – pp, ps – Chad Kolarik 3
Jordan Caron 2 – 5:09; Kyle MacKinnon 1 – 7:09; Jamie Tardif 4 – 8:34; Carter Camper 6 – pp – 10:24		Second period	6:23 – Brian Gibbons 2; 12:43 – pp – Paul Thompson 1
Craig Cunningham 2 – 5:25; Chris Bourque 4 – 18:05; Jamie Tardif 5 – pp – 19:24		Third period	16:31 – pp – Chris Collins 2; 17:19 – Paul Thompson 2
Niklas Svedberg 25 saves / 30 shots		Goalie stats	Jeff Zatkoff 19 saves / 27 shots

May 11	Providence Bruins	4 – 2	Wilkes-Barre/Scranton Penguins	Dunkin' Donuts Center	Recap
Jamie Tardif 6 – pp – 5:48; Ryan Spooner 2 – 11:24; Jamie Tardif 7 – pp – 17:25; Chris Bourque 5 – 19:31		First period	4:40 – sh – Warren Peters 2
No scoring		Second period	14:47 – pp – Brian Gibbons 3
No scoring		Third period	No scoring
Niklas Svedberg 38 saves / 40 shots		Goalie stats	Jeff Zatkoff 9 saves / 13 shots Brad Thiessen 16 saves / 16 shots

May 15	Wilkes-Barre/Scranton Penguins	1 – 2	OT	Providence Bruins	Mohegan Sun Arena at Casey Plaza	Recap
No scoring		First period		No scoring
Trevor Smith 1 – 10:42		Second period		3:04 – Jared Knight 1
No scoring		Third period		No scoring
No scoring		First overtime period		0:31 – Carter Camper 7
Brad Thiessen 20 saves / 22 shots		Goalie stats		Niklas Svedberg 32 saves / 33 shots

May 17	Wilkes-Barre/Scranton Penguins	3 – 1	Providence Bruins	Mohegan Sun Arena at Casey Plaza	Recap
No scoring		First period	7:37 – Carter Camper 8
Warren Peters 3 – 6:25; Riley Holzapfel 3 – 16:10; Chad Kolarik 4 – pp – 17:57		Second period	No scoring
No scoring		Third period	No scoring
Brad Thiessen 31 saves / 32 shots		Goalie stats	Niklas Svedberg 19 saves / 22 shots

May 18	Wilkes-Barre/Scranton Penguins	4 – 0	Providence Bruins	Mohegan Sun Arena at Casey Plaza	Recap
Brian Dumoulin 1 – pp – 10:55; Trevor Smith 2 – pp – 16:47		First period	No scoring
No scoring		Second period	No scoring
Adam Payerl 1 – 3:39; Paul Thompson 3 – pp – 16:44		Third period	No scoring
Brad Thiessen 30 saves / 30 shots		Goalie stats	Niklas Svedberg 25 saves / 29 shots

May 20	Providence Bruins	1 – 2	OT	Wilkes-Barre/Scranton Penguins	Dunkin' Donuts Center	Recap
No scoring		First period		No scoring
Craig Cunningham 3 – 1:07		Second period		6:03 – pp – Brian Dumoulin 2
No scoring		Third period		No scoring
No scoring		First overtime period		3:26 – Trevor Smith 3
Niklas Svedberg 16 saves / 18 shots		Goalie stats		Brad Thiessen 46 saves / 47 shots

May 22	Providence Bruins	0 – 5	Wilkes-Barre/Scranton Penguins	Dunkin' Donuts Center	Recap
No scoring		First period	No scoring
No scoring		Second period	4:44 – pp – Chad Kolarik 5; 13:04 – Warren Peters 4; 15:14 – Adam Payerl 2; 17:15 – Zach Sill 2
No scoring		Third period	15:25 – Trevor Smith 4
Niklas Svedberg 15 saves / 19 shots Michael Hutchinson 4 saves / 5 shots		Goalie stats	Brad Thiessen 34 saves / 34 shots

Wilkes-Barre/Scranton wins series 4–3

==== (2) Springfield Falcons vs. (3) Syracuse Crunch ====
May 10	Springfield Falcons	2 – 5	Syracuse Crunch	MassMutual Center	Recap
Nicholas Drazenovic 2 – pp – 10:06		First period	8:40 – pp – Mark Barberio 2; 9:00 – Richard Panik 2; 11:26 – J. T. Brown 2; 18:13 – Brett Connolly 2
No scoring		Second period	10:10 – Tyler Johnson 3
Ryan Craig 1 – pp – 19:58		Third period	No scoring
Curtis McElhinney 4 saves / 9 shots Allen York 11 saves / 11 shots		Goalie stats	Cedrick Desjardins 22 saves / 24 shots

May 11	Springfield Falcons	3 – 5	Syracuse Crunch	MassMutual Center	Recap
Ryan Russell 1 – 14:40		First period	1:02 – pp – Richard Panik 3; 1:15 – Mike Angelidis 2
Trent Vogelhuber 2 – 14:29		Second period	8:31 – pp – Tyler Johnson 4; 14:05 – sh – Tyler Johnson 5
Boone Jenner 2 – 8:04		Third period	6:47 – pp – Tyler Johnson 6
Curtis McElhinney 20 saves / 25 shots		Goalie stats	Cedrick Desjardins 28 saves / 31 shots

May 15	Syracuse Crunch	3 – 0	Springfield Falcons	Oncenter War Memorial Arena	Recap
Richard Panik 4 – 15:15		First period	No scoring
No scoring		Second period	No scoring
Ondrej Palat 4 – sh – 0:08; Tyler Johnson 7 – sh – 7:24		Third period	No scoring
Cedrick Desjardins 24 saves / 24 shots		Goalie stats	Curtis McElhinney 22 saves / 25 shots

May 17	Syracuse Crunch	5 – 2	Springfield Falcons	Oncenter War Memorial Arena	Recap
J. T. Wyman 1 – 6:04; Mark Barberio 3 – 7:52		First period	No scoring
J. T. Wyman 2 – 17:20		Second period	2:38 – pp – Ryan Craig 2
Matt Taormina 1 – 19:45; Dan Sexton 2 – en – 18:01		Third period	8:35 – Andrew Joudrey 1
Cedrick Desjardins 28 saves / 30 shots		Goalie stats	Curtis McElhinney 35 saves / 39 shots

Syracuse wins series 4–0

=== Western Conference ===
==== (1) Texas Stars vs. (5) Oklahoma City Barons ====
May 9	Texas Stars	1 – 2	OT	Oklahoma City Barons	Cedar Park Center	Recap
No scoring		First period		15:08 – Mark Arcobello 4
Francis Wathier 1 – 16:30		Second period		No scoring
No scoring		Third period		No scoring
No scoring		First overtime period		1:28 – Anton Lander 3
Cristopher Nihlstorp 24 saves / 26 shots		Goalie stats		Yann Danis 34 saves / 35 shots

May 11	Texas Stars	2 – 1	Oklahoma City Barons	Cedar Park Center	Recap
Mike Hedden 1 – 17:52		First period	No scoring
Joe Morrow 1 – pp – 17:12		Second period	No scoring
No scoring		Third period	18:05 – Mark Arcobello 5
Cristopher Nihlstorp 27 saves / 28 shots		Goalie stats	Yann Danis 37 saves / 39 shots

May 13	Oklahoma City Barons	4 – 0	Texas Stars	Cox Convention Center	Recap
No scoring		First period	No scoring
Toni Rajala 3 – 5:26; Anton Lander 4 – pp – 12:28		Second period	No scoring
Mark Arcobello 6 – 4:37; C. J. Stretch 2 – en – 19:42		Third period	No scoring
Yann Danis 30 saves / 30 shots		Goalie stats	Cristopher Nihlstorp 27 saves / 30 shots

May 15	Oklahoma City Barons	7 – 3	Texas Stars	Cox Convention Center	Recap
No scoring		First period	No scoring
C. J. Stretch 3 – 1:27; Mark Arcobello 7 – 14:33		Second period	6:49 – Brett Ritchie 2; 13:13 – pp – Colton Sceviour 1; 18:15 – Joe Morrow 2
Antti Tyrvainen 1 – 6:52; Taylor Fedun 1 – 14:24; Mark Arcobello 8 – 18:00; Antti Tyrvainen 2 – en – 18:36; Garrett Stafford 1 – pp – 19:45		Third period	No scoring
Yann Danis 26 saves / 29 shots		Goalie stats	Cristopher Nihlstorp 39 saves / 45 shots

May 16	Oklahoma City Barons	5 – 1	Texas Stars	Cox Convention Center	Recap
Teemu Hartikainen 4 – 17:21		First period	No scoring
Taylor Fedun 2 – 1:36; C. J. Stretch 4 – 9:16		Second period	No scoring
Garrett Stafford 2 – pp – 1:24; Mark Arcobello 9 – 12:02		Third period	17:03 – pp – Justin Dowling 1
Yann Danis 33 saves / 34 shots		Goalie stats	Cristopher Nihlstorp 29 saves / 34 shots

Oklahoma City wins series 4–1

==== (2) Toronto Marlies vs. (3) Grand Rapids Griffins ====
May 10	Toronto Marlies	0 – 7	Grand Rapids Griffins	Ricoh Coliseum	Recap
No scoring		First period	8:55 – Mitch Callahan 1; 9:29 – Chad Billins 1
No scoring		Second period	1:14 – pp – Teemu Pulkkinen 3; 19:42 – Tomas Tatar 4
No scoring		Third period	3:16 – pp – Tomas Tatar 5; 5:48 – Luke Glendening 3; 15:19 – Jan Mursak 2
Drew MacIntyre 22 saves / 28 shots Garret Sparks 9 saves / 10 shots		Goalie stats	Petr Mrazek 25 saves / 25 shots

May 11	Toronto Marlies	4 – 2	Grand Rapids Griffins	Ricoh Coliseum	Recap
No scoring		First period	No scoring
Ryan Lasch 1 – pp – 10:30; Greg Scott 6 – sh – 15:02		Second period	8:36 – Tomas Jurco 3; 16:43 – sh – Landon Ferraro 1
Will Acton 2 – 2:36; Greg Scott 7 – en – 18:41		Third period	No scoring
Drew MacIntyre 30 saves / 32 shots		Goalie stats	Petr Mrazek 27 saves / 30 shots

May 15	Grand Rapids Griffins	5 – 4	Toronto Marlies	Van Andel Arena	Recap
Adam Almqvist 3 – 3:45; Jeff Hoggan 2 – 5:45		First period	14:21 – Ryan Hamilton 1
Tomas Tatar 6 – 2:38; Francis Pare 2 – pp – 17:06		Second period	4:20 – Spencer Abbott 1; 9:16 – pp – Greg McKegg 3
Jan Mursak 3 – 0:46		Third period	5:00 – Carter Ashton 1
Petr Mrazek 16 saves / 20 shots		Goalie stats	Drew MacIntyre 27 saves / 32 shots

May 17	Grand Rapids Griffins	4 – 1	Toronto Marlies	Van Andel Arena	Recap
No scoring		First period	18:05 – Carter Ashton 2
Tomas Jurco 4 – pp – 4:15		Second period	No scoring
Landon Ferraro 2 – 10:13; Jeff Hoggan 3 – en – 19:07; Jan Mursak 4 – en – 19:24		Third period	No scoring
Petr Mrazek 17 saves / 18 shots		Goalie stats	Drew MacIntyre 32 saves / 34 shots

May 18	Grand Rapids Griffins	1 – 4	Toronto Marlies	Van Andel Arena	Recap
No scoring		First period	No scoring
No scoring		Second period	10:52 – Spencer Abbott 2; 15:48 – Will Acton 3
Luke Glendening 4 – 4:25		Third period	2:20 – pp – Morgan Rielly 1; 12:58 – pp – Michael Zigomanis 2
Petr Mrazek 20 saves / 24 shots		Goalie stats	Drew MacIntyre 32 saves / 33 shots

May 21	Toronto Marlies	3 – 4	Grand Rapids Griffins	Ricoh Coliseum	Recap
Carter Ashton 3 – 4:15; Paul Ranger 2 – 19:57		First period	No scoring
Will Acton 4 – 4:37		Second period	4:00 – pp – Tomas Tatar 7
No scoring		Third period	10:04 – Jan Mursak 5; 10:32 – Tomas Tatar 8; 15:57 – Luke Glendening 5
Drew MacIntyre 27 saves / 31 shots		Goalie stats	Petr Mrazek 15 saves / 18 shots

Grand Rapids wins series 4–2

== Conference finals ==
=== Eastern Conference ===
==== (3) Syracuse Crunch vs. (5) Wilkes-Barre/Scranton Penguins ====
May 25	Syracuse Crunch	2 – 4	Wilkes-Barre/Scranton Penguins	Oncenter War Memorial Arena	Recap
Brendan Mikkelson 1 – 16:41		First period	1:55 – Alex Grant 1; 17:12 – pp – Trevor Smith 5
Tyler Johnson 8 – pp – 5:38		Second period	9:24 – Christiaan Minella 1; 19:04 – pp – Alex Grant 2
No scoring		Third period	No scoring
Cedrick Desjardins 19 saves / 23 shots		Goalie stats	Brad Thiessen 24 saves / 26 shots

May 26	Syracuse Crunch	3 – 2	Wilkes-Barre/Scranton Penguins	Oncenter War Memorial Arena	Recap
Dan Sexton 3 – pp – 18:56		First period	No scoring
Matt Taormina 2 – 7:07; Dmitri Korobov 1 – sh – 11:40		Second period	8:13 – pp – Joey Mormina 1
No scoring		Third period	14:02 – Riley Holzapfel 4
Cedrick Desjardins 16 saves / 18 shots		Goalie stats	Brad Thiessen 34 saves / 37 shots

May 29	Wilkes-Barre/Scranton Penguins	0 – 2	Syracuse Crunch	Mohegan Sun Arena at Casey Plaza	Recap
No scoring		First period	No scoring
No scoring		Second period	7:29 – Vladislav Namestnikov 1
No scoring		Third period	19:55 – en – J. T. Brown 3
Brad Thiessen 20 saves / 21 shots		Goalie stats	Cedrick Desjardins 22 saves / 22 shots

May 31	Wilkes-Barre/Scranton Penguins	2 – 4	Syracuse Crunch	Mohegan Sun Arena at Casey Plaza	Recap
Scott Harrington 1 – pp – 13:40		First period	14:57 – Brendan Mikkelson 2
Jayson Megna 2 – 16:40		Second period	18:12 – Brett Connolly 3
No scoring		Third period	1:50 – Tyler Johnson 9; 19:04 – en – J. T. Wyman 3
Brad Thiessen 20 saves / 23 shots		Goalie stats	Cedrick Desjardins 21 saves / 23 shots

June 1	Syracuse Crunch	7 – 0	Wilkes-Barre/Scranton Penguins	Oncenter War Memorial Arena	Recap
Vladislav Namestnikov 2 – 16:04; Radko Gudas 2 – 16:56		First period	No scoring
Philippe Paradis 1 – 13:37; Dan Sexton 4 – 15:31; Ondrej Palat 5 – pp – 17:58		Second period	No scoring
Philippe Paradis 2 – 1:02; Philippe Paradis 3 – 5:43		Third period	No scoring
Cedrick Desjardins 23 saves / 23 shots		Goalie stats	Jeff Zatkoff 22 saves / 29 shots Brad Thiessen 1 save / 1 shot

Syracuse wins series 4–1

=== Western Conference ===
==== (3) Grand Rapids Griffins vs. (5) Oklahoma City Barons ====
May 24	Grand Rapids Griffins	2 – 1	Oklahoma City Barons	Van Andel Arena	Recap
Brennan Evans 1 – 7:15		First period	16:40 – Andrew Hotham 2
Landon Ferraro 3 – 2:35		Second period	No scoring
No scoring		Third period	No scoring
Petr Mrazek 27 saves / 28 shots		Goalie stats	Yann Danis 26 saves / 28 shots

May 25	Grand Rapids Griffins	2 – 4	Oklahoma City Barons	Van Andel Arena	Recap
Tomas Tatar 9 – 17:14		First period	No scoring
No scoring		Second period	6:38 – pp – C. J. Stretch 5
Mitch Callahan 2 – 2:58		Third period	1:03 – Teemu Hartikainen 5; 7:45 – Mark Arcobello 10; 19:36 – en – Teemu Hartikainen 6
Petr Mrazek 33 saves / 36 shots		Goalie stats	Yann Danis 20 saves / 22 shots

May 29	Oklahoma City Barons	4 – 1	Grand Rapids Griffins	Cox Convention Center	Recap
Ben Eager 1 – 7:14; Josh Green 4 – 8:25; Philippe Cornet 2 – 16:35		First period	No scoring
No scoring		Second period	No scoring
Jonathan Cheechoo 3 – en – 18:43		Third period	15:06 – Chad Billins 2
Yann Danis 20 saves / 21 shots		Goalie stats	Petr Mrazek 29 saves / 32 shots

June 1	Oklahoma City Barons	0 – 4	Grand Rapids Griffins	Cox Convention Center	Recap
No scoring		First period	12:08 – pp – Joakim Andersson 1
No scoring		Second period	1:57 – Riley Sheahan 2; 8:25 – Landon Ferraro 4
No scoring		Third period	18:11 – en, pp – Jan Mursak 6
Yann Danis 28 saves / 31 shots		Goalie stats	Petr Mrazek 40 saves / 40 shots

June 2	Oklahoma City Barons	0 – 3	Grand Rapids Griffins	Cox Convention Center	Recap
No scoring		First period	No scoring
No scoring		Second period	15:13 – Tomas Jurco 5; 17:12 – sh – Mitch Callahan 3; 19:27 – pp – Tomas Tatar 10
No scoring		Third period	No scoring
Yann Danis 22 saves / 25 shots		Goalie stats	Petr Mrazek 37 saves / 37 shots

June 4	Grand Rapids Griffins	3 – 4	Oklahoma City Barons	Van Andel Arena	Recap
Tomas Jurco 6 – pp – 18:39		First period	13:54 – pp – Mark Arcobello 11
Mitch Callahan 4 – 4:27; Jeff Hoggan 4 – 18:31		Second period	No scoring
No scoring		Third period	9:41 – Mark Arcobello 12; 17:33 – Toni Rajala 4; 18:55 – Anton Lander 5
Petr Mrazek 26 saves / 30 shots		Goalie stats	Yann Danis 33 saves / 36 shots

June 5	Grand Rapids Griffins	5 – 4	Oklahoma City Barons	Van Andel Arena	Recap
Jan Mursak 7 – 0:54; Tomas Tatar 11 – pp – 15:55		First period	13:07 – Chris VandeVelde 2; 13:32 – Teemu Hartikainen 7
Gustav Nyquist 1 – pp – 9:47		Second period	17:02 – Antti Tyrvainen 3
Jan Mursak 8 – 6:32; Tomas Jurco 7 – 13:48		Third period	1:21 – Taylor Fedun 3
Petr Mrazek 35 saves / 39 shots		Goalie stats	Yann Danis 28 saves / 33 shots

Grand Rapids wins series 4–3

The game scheduled for May 31 was postponed to June 1 because of dangerous weather conditions around the Cox Convention Center.

== Calder Cup Finals ==
=== Syracuse Crunch vs. Grand Rapids Griffins ===
June 8	Syracuse Crunch	1 – 3	Grand Rapids Griffins	Oncenter War Memorial Arena	Recap
No scoring		First period	6:45 – Mitch Callahan 5
No scoring		Second period	No scoring
Jean-Philippe Cote 1 – 13:19		Third period	12:00 – Riley Sheahan 3; 19:45 – en, pp – Gustav Nyquist 2
Cedrick Desjardins 18 saves / 20 shots		Goalie stats	Petr Mrazek 28 saves / 29 shots

June 9	Syracuse Crunch	4 – 6	Grand Rapids Griffins	Oncenter War Memorial Arena	Recap
Andrej Sustr 1 – 14:03		First period	4:29 – Tomas Tatar 12; 11:31 – Triston Grant 1
Richard Panik 5 – pp – 10:06; Brett Connolly 4 – pp – 16:12; J. T. Brown 4 – 18:23		Second period	6:23 – Landon Ferraro 5; 12:09 – pp – Tomas Jurco 8; 18:49 – pp – Francis Pare 3
No scoring		Third period	14:56 – Jan Mursak 9
Cedrick Desjardins 23 saves / 29 shots		Goalie stats	Petr Mrazek 30 saves / 34 shots

June 12	Grand Rapids Griffins	4 – 2	Syracuse Crunch	Van Andel Arena	Recap
No scoring		First period	10:21 – Richard Panik 6
Tomas Tatar 13 – 2:09; Luke Glendening 6 – 4:53		Second period	9:56 – Dan Sexton 5
Jan Mursak 10 – 15:11; Jeff Hoggan 5 – 17:32		Third period	No scoring
Petr Mrazek 26 saves / 28 shots		Goalie stats	Cedrick Desjardins 25 saves / 29 shots

June 14	Grand Rapids Griffins	2 – 3	Syracuse Crunch	Van Andel Arena	Recap
Joakim Andersson 2 – 3:37; Jan Mursak 11 – 11:04		First period	5:04 – Brett Connolly 5
No scoring		Second period	14:01 – Ondrej Palat 6; 16:52 – Richard Panik 7
No scoring		Third period	No scoring
Petr Mrazek 21 saves / 24 shots		Goalie stats	Cedrick Desjardins 26 saves / 28 shots

June 15	Grand Rapids Griffins	2 – 5	Syracuse Crunch	Van Andel Arena	Recap
Triston Grant 2 – 17:38		First period	8:39 – Ondrej Palat 7; 16:09 – pp – Brett Connolly 6
Tomas Tatar 14 – pp – 5:36		Second period	11:59 – pp – Richard Panik 8
No scoring		Third period	0:36 – Tyler Johnson 10; 17:16 – en – Dan Sexton 6
Petr Mrazek 17 saves / 21 shots		Goalie stats	Cedrick Desjardins 40 saves / 42 shots

June 18	Syracuse Crunch	2 – 5	Grand Rapids Griffins	Oncenter War Memorial Arena	Recap
Richard Panik 9 – 17:15		First period	No scoring
No scoring		Second period	2:23 – Mitch Callahan 6; 12:41 – pp – Tomas Tatar 15
Andrej Sustr 2 – 5:14		Third period	9:54 – Brennan Evans 2; 19:11 – en, pp – Tomas Tatar 16; 19:54 – en – Joakim Andersson 3
Cedrick Desjardins 20 saves / 23 shots		Goalie stats	Petr Mrazek 24 saves / 26 shots

Grand Rapids won series 4–2

== Playoff statistical leaders ==
=== Leading skaters ===
These are the top ten skaters based on points. If there is a tie in points, goals take precedence over assists.

GP = Games played; G = Goals; A = Assists; Pts = Points; +/– = Plus–minus; PIM = Penalty minutes

Player	Team	GP	G	A	Pts	PIM
Ondrej Palat	Syracuse Crunch	18	7	19	26	12
Tomas Tatar	Grand Rapids Griffins	24	16	5	21	23
Tyler Johnson	Syracuse Crunch	18	10	11	21	18
Mark Arcobello	Oklahoma City Barons	17	12	8	20	14
Jan Mursak	Grand Rapids Griffins	23	11	6	17	26
Luke Glendening	Grand Rapids Griffins	24	6	10	16	30
Landon Ferraro	Grand Rapids Griffins	24	5	11	16	11
Toni Rajala	Oklahoma City Barons	17	4	12	16	8
Riley Sheahan	Grand Rapids Griffins	24	3	13	16	10
Teemu Hartikainen	Oklahoma City Barons	17	7	8	15	6

=== Leading goaltenders ===
This is a combined table of the top five goaltenders based on goals against average and the top five goaltenders based on save percentage with at least 360 minutes played. The table is initially sorted by goals against average, with the criterion for inclusion in bold.

GP = Games played; W = Wins; L = Losses; SA = Shots against; GA = Goals against; GAA = Goals against average; SV% = Save percentage; SO = Shutouts; TOI = Time on ice (in minutes)

Player	Team	GP	W	L	SA	GA	GAA	SV%	SO	TOI
Brad Thiessen	Wilkes-Barre/Scranton Penguins	12	6	4	310	15	**1.38**	**.952**	2	654
Cedrick Desjardins	Syracuse Crunch	18	13	5	458	42	**2.30**	.908	3	1097
Cristopher Nilstorp	Texas Stars	9	4	5	270	21	**2.30**	**.922**	1	547
Petr Mrazek	Grand Rapids Griffins	24	15	9	658	55	**2.31**	**.916**	4	1431
Yann Danis	Oklahoma City Barons	17	10	7	535	41	**2.41**	**.923**	1	1019
Drew MacIntyre	Toronto Marlies	9	5	4	288	25	2.85	**.913**	1	526

== See also ==
- 2012–13 AHL season
- List of AHL seasons

Preceded by 2012 Calder Cup playoffs	Calder Cup playoffs 2013	Succeeded by 2014 Calder Cup playoffs
