= Teemu Pulkkinen =

Finnish ice hockey player (born 1992)

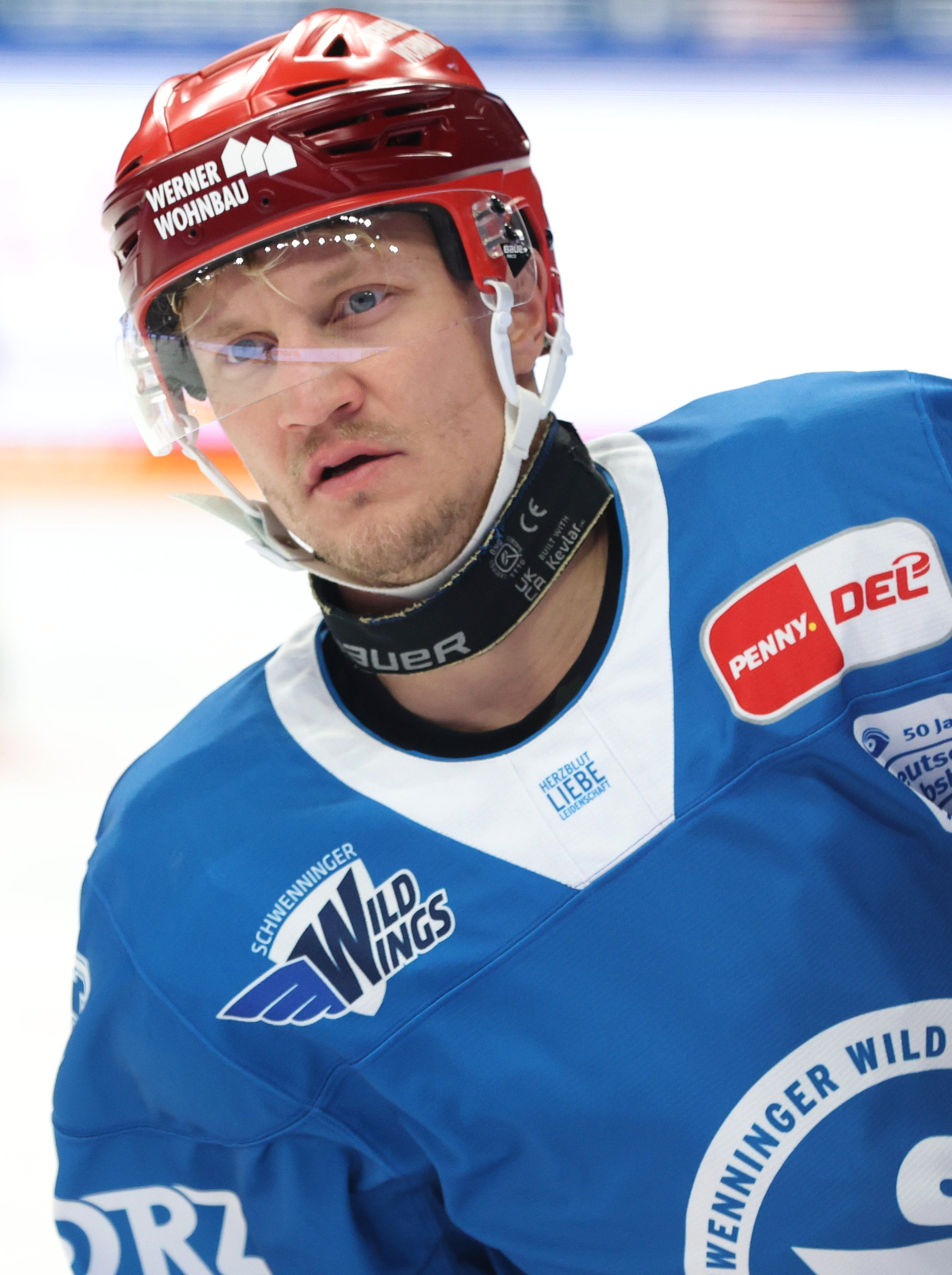
- Pulkkinen with Schwenninger Wild Wings in 2024
- Born: 2 January 1992 (age 34) Vantaa, Finland
- Height: 5 ft 10 in (178 cm)
- Weight: 181 lb (82 kg; 12 st 13 lb)
- Position: Right wing
- Shoots: Right
- DEL2 team Former teams: Starbulls Rosenheim; Jokerit; Detroit Red Wings; Minnesota Wild; Arizona Coyotes; Dinamo Minsk; Dynamo Moscow; Lokomotiv Yaroslavl; Traktor Chelyabinsk; Kunlun Red Star; Schwenninger Wild Wings; HK Poprad; HC La Chaux-de-Fonds; Kiekko-Vantaa
- National team: Finland
- NHL draft: 111th overall, 2010; Detroit Red Wings
- Playing career: 2009–present

Teemu Pulkkinen (born 2 January 1992) is a Finnish professional ice hockey right winger for Starbulls Rosenheim in the second German league, DEL2. He previously played for the club of his hometown, Kiekko-Vantaa who plays in Mestis. Pulkkinen was drafted 111th overall by the Detroit Red Wings in the 2010 NHL entry draft.

== Playing career ==
=== Jokerit ===
Pulkkinen made his first appearance for Jokerit on 5 December 2008, at the age of 16. Before joining the team, he was an integral part of Jokerit's Junior-B club, scoring 36 goals and a total of 60 points in 32 games during the 2007–08 regular season. His team went on to win the Finnish championship, and Pulkkinen finished as the top scorer in the playoffs with 17 points in just six games.

During the 2010–11 season, in his rookie season with Jokerit, Pulkkinen played in 55 games, recording 18 goals and 36 assists. He broke Teemu Selänne's 20-year-old single-season record for assists by a rookie, with 36.

=== Professional ===
On 29 May 2012, Pulkkinen signed a three-year, entry-level contract with the Detroit Red Wings. During the 2012–13 season, he was assigned to the Red Wings' American Hockey League (AHL) affiliate, the Grand Rapids Griffins, in April 2013 following the completion of his third season with Jokerit in Finland. He scored his first North American goal in a Calder Cup playoff game on 1 May against the Houston Aeros. Pulkkinen played in 14 playoff games for the Griffins, recording three goals and two assists during the team's run to the Calder Cup.

During the 2013–14 season, in his first full season with the Griffins, Pulkkinen led the team in scoring, finishing with 31 goals and 28 assists in 71 games.

On 14 March 2014, Pulkkinen made his NHL debut for Detroit in a game against the Edmonton Oilers. At the time of his call-up, Pulkkinen was the Griffins' leading scorer and ranked second among all AHL rookies with 51 points in 60 games. He also led AHL rookies in goals (26), shots (175) and plus-minus rating (+20).

On 8 January 2015, Pulkkinen was recalled by the Red Wings. At the time of his call-up, Pulkkinen was the Griffins' leading scorer and ranked first in the AHL with 20 goals and second with 39 points in 33 games. He was also on an eight-game goal scoring streak for Grand Rapids, which tied the franchise record set by Donald MacLean during the 2005–06 season. It was the longest goal-scoring streak in the AHL since Drayson Bowman recorded a goal in eight-straight games early in the 2012–13 season. On 20 January, Pulkkinen scored his first career NHL goal against Devan Dubnyk of the Minnesota Wild.

On 29 January, Pulkkinen recorded his first career hat-trick, all on the power play. He became just the second player in Griffins franchise history to record three power play goals in one game, following Joe Murphy in 2001. On 15 February, Pulkkinen recorded his AHL-leading 30th goal of the season, becoming the first player in franchise history to record back-to-back 30-goal seasons. Pulkkinen finished the 2014–15 season recording 34 goals and 27 assists in 46 games for an AHL-best 1.33 points per game. He finished second in points recorded for the Griffins, and was the leading goal-scorer in the AHL, winning the Willie Marshall Award despite the fact that he played in at least 27 fewer games than the three next-highest goal scorers. Additionally, in 31 games played with the Detroit Red Wings in the NHL, Pulkkinen recorded five goals and three assists.

On 6 May 2015, Pulkkinen scored his first career Calder Cup playoff hat-trick, and the seventh playoff hat-trick in Griffins history. He also became the Griffins' all-time leading post-season goal scorer, with 17 goals, surpassing Derek King and Tomáš Tatar's tally of 16 goals. During the 2015 Calder Cup playoffs, Pulkkinen was the leading scorer for the Griffins, and led the AHL in goals, recording 14 goals and four assists in 16 games, while helping the Griffins reach the Western Conference Finals for the second time in three seasons.

On 21 July 2015, the Red Wings signed Pulkkinen to a one-year contract extension.

On 13 July 2016, the Red Wings signed Pulkkinen to another one-year contract extension, however on October 11, 2016, before the beginning of the 2016–17 season, Pulkinnen was waived by Detroit for the purpose of assignment to Grand Rapids, and was claimed off waivers by the Minnesota Wild. He appeared in 9 games with the Wild, contributing 1 goal, before he was waived and assigned to AHL affiliate, the Iowa Wild. In 47 games with Iowa, Pulkkinen lead the team with 18 goals and produced 36 points to earn a selection to the 2017 AHL All-Star Game. Unable to earn a recall to Minnesota, Pulkkinen was placed on waivers on 26 February 2017, and traded the following day to the Arizona Coyotes for future considerations. Pulkkinen played out the season with the Coyotes, scoring a lone goal in 4 games.

Having been left exposed by the Coyotes at the 2017 NHL Expansion Draft, Pulkkinen was selected by the Vegas Golden Knights on 21 June 2017. As a restricted free agent, Pulkkinen agreed to a one-year, $700,000 contract with the Golden Knights on 6 July 2017. He was assigned by Vegas to AHL affiliate, the Chicago Wolves, for the duration of the 2017–18 season. He continued his offensive dominance at the AHL level in scoring a personal high of 65 points in 75 games.

As a restricted free agent from the Golden Knights, Pulkkinen opted to pause his North American career in agreeing to a one-year contract with Belarusian club, HC Dinamo Minsk of the KHL on July 18, 2018.

On August 5, 2019, Pulkkinen was offered a PTO contract through September 8 by Lausanne HC of the National League (NL). Lausanne HC decided to end his try-out on August 29, 2019, allowing him to return to HC Dinamo Minsk of the KHL.

In the midst of his final year under contract in the 2020–21 season, Pulkkinen added 9 goals and 14 points in 22 appearances before he was traded to Lokomotiv Yaroslavl in exchange for Magnus Pääjärvi on 30 November 2020.

At the conclusion of his contract with Lokomotiv, Pulkkinen signed on the opening day of free agency, agreeing to a two-year contract with Traktor Chelyabinsk on 1 May 2021. Following the 2022 Russian invasion of Ukraine, he decided to participate in the 2021-22 KHL postseason, despite the exit of the majority of Finnish players and two of the KHL's non-Russia-based teams.

Following two seasons with Traktor Chelyabinsk, Pulkkinen remained a free agent leading into the 2023–24 season. On 29 September 2023, Pulkkinen was signed to a one-year contract with Chinese-based KHL club, Kunlun Red Star.

On August 28, 2024, Pulkkinen signed as a free agent with the Schwenninger Wild Wings of the German Ice Hockey League (DEL). He recorded 11 points in 22 games before the two parties agreed to terminate his contract mutually.

On December 16, 2024, Pulkkinen signed a contract to play the remainder of the 2024–25 season with HK Poprad of the Slovak Extraliga.

On August 1, 2025, Pulkkinen signed a 1-year contract with Kiekko-Vantaa, a team playing in the Finnish Mestis league.

== International play ==
Medal record

Representing Finland

Ice hockey

World Championships
Silver medal – second place	2016 Russia	

World U18 Championships
Bronze medal – third place	2010 Belarus	
Bronze medal – third place	2009 United States	

Pulkkinen represented Finland at the 2009 IIHF World U18 Championships in the United States, where he recorded 13 points in six games to finish third in tournament scoring, behind teammate Toni Rajala and Russian Vladimir Tarasenko, helping lead Finland to a bronze medal. With 28 points, Pulkkinen currently ranks second all-time in IIHF World U18 Championship scoring.

In the 2010 IIHF World U18 Championships, Pulkkinen recorded ten goals and five assists in six games to become the tournament's leading scorer; he was also selected as the tournament's best forward.

Pulkkinen was part of the Finnish national team for the 2012 World Junior Championships. In a game against Denmark on 30 December 2011, Pulkkinen scored four goals in the third period, part of a five-point game for him; this tied a record for most goals in a period during a World Junior game, first set by Ján Vodila of Czechoslovakia during the 1980 World Juniors.

Pulkkinen represented Finland at the 2016 IIHF World Championship, where he recorded two assists in eight games and won a silver medal.

== Career statistics ==
=== Regular season and playoffs ===
			Regular season					Playoffs
Season	Team	League	GP	G	A	Pts	PIM	GP	G	A	Pts	PIM
2007–08	Jokerit	FIN U18	23	23	17	40	8	6	11	6	17	6
2008–09	Jokerit	FIN U18	4	6	7	13	2	—	—	—	—	—
2008–09	Jokerit	FIN U20	24	15	13	28	12	—	—	—	—	—
2008–09	Jokerit	SM-l	3	0	0	0	6	—	—	—	—	—
2009–10	Jokerit	FIN U20	17	20	21	41	41	4	3	3	6	0
2009–10	Jokerit	SM-l	12	1	2	3	6	—	—	—	—	—
2010–11	Jokerit	SM-l	55	18	36	54	32	3	0	1	1	0
2011–12	Jokerit	SM-l	56	16	21	37	41	4	0	1	1	2
2012–13	Jokerit	SM-l	59	14	20	34	49	6	2	3	5	22
2012–13	Grand Rapids Griffins	AHL	2	0	1	1	2	14	3	2	5	10
2013–14	Grand Rapids Griffins	AHL	71	31	28	59	34	10	5	6	11	10
2013–14	Detroit Red Wings	NHL	3	0	0	0	2	—	—	—	—	—
2014–15	Grand Rapids Griffins	AHL	46	34	27	61	30	16	14	4	18	22
2014–15	Detroit Red Wings	NHL	31	5	3	8	10	—	—	—	—	—
2015–16	Detroit Red Wings	NHL	36	6	6	12	14	—	—	—	—	—
2016–17	Minnesota Wild	NHL	9	1	0	1	2	—	—	—	—	—
2016–17	Iowa Wild	AHL	47	18	18	36	36	—	—	—	—	—
2016–17	Arizona Coyotes	NHL	4	1	0	1	4	—	—	—	—	—
2017–18	Chicago Wolves	AHL	75	29	36	65	44	3	1	0	1	4
2018–19	Dinamo Minsk	KHL	50	15	14	29	26	—	—	—	—	—
2019–20	Dinamo Minsk	KHL	33	17	10	27	26	—	—	—	—	—
2019–20	Dynamo Moscow	KHL	17	6	6	12	14	3	0	1	1	2
2020–21	Dynamo Moscow	KHL	22	9	5	14	16	—	—	—	—	—
2020–21	Lokomotiv Yaroslavl	KHL	24	7	9	16	16	11	7	2	9	8
2021–22	Traktor Chelyabinsk	KHL	49	22	12	34	22	10	1	2	3	2
2022–23	Traktor Chelyabinsk	KHL	63	15	12	27	24	—	—	—	—	—
2023–24	Kunlun Red Star	KHL	37	5	8	13	23	—	—	—	—	—
Liiga totals			185	49	79	128	134	13	2	5	7	24
NHL totals			83	13	9	22	32	—	—	—	—	—
KHL totals			295	96	76	172	167	24	8	5	13	12

=== International ===
Year	Team	Event	Result	GP	G	A	Pts	PIM
2008	Finland	U17	6th	5	5	3	8	10
2009	Finland	WJC18	3rd place, bronze medalist(s)	6	7	6	13	4
2010	Finland	WJC	5th	7	0	8	8	6
2010	Finland	WJC18	3rd place, bronze medalist(s)	6	10	5	15	10
2011	Finland	WJC	6th	6	3	6	9	6
2012	Finland	WJC	4th	7	6	4	10	2
2016	Finland	WC	2nd place, silver medalist(s)	8	0	2	2	2
Junior totals				37	31	32	63	38
Senior totals				8	0	2	2	2

== Awards and honours ==
Award	Year
AHL
All-Rookie Team	2013–14
First All-Star Team	2014–15
Willie Marshall Award	2014–15
International
IIHF World U18 Championship First Team All-Star	2010
