= Adam Almqvist =

Swedish ice hockey player (born 1991)

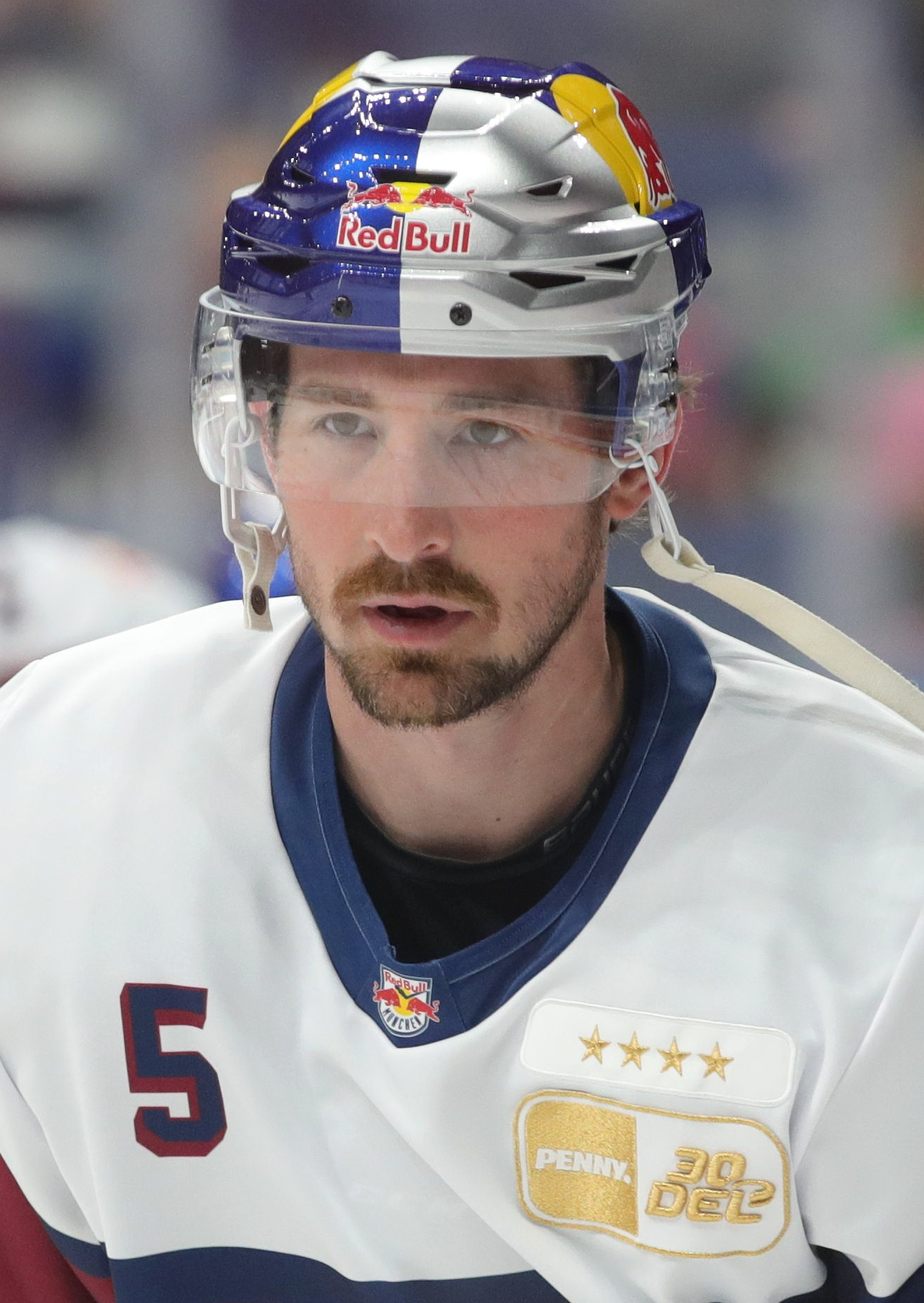
- Almqvist with the EHC München in 2023
- Born: February 27, 1991 (age 35) Jönköping, Sweden
- Height: 5 ft 11 in (180 cm)
- Weight: 174 lb (79 kg; 12 st 6 lb)
- Position: Defence
- Shoots: Left
- ICEHL team Former teams: HC Pustertal Wölfe; Grand Rapids Griffins; Detroit Red Wings; Severstal Cherepovets; HV71; Frölunda HC; SC Bern; Admiral Vladivostok; Dinamo Minsk; Traktor Chelyabinsk; EV Zug; EHC Red Bull München; Kölner Haie
- NHL draft: 210th overall, 2009; Detroit Red Wings
- Playing career: 2012–present

Adam Almqvist (born February 27, 1991) is a Swedish professional ice hockey player who plays for HC Pustertal Wölfe of the ICE Hockey League (ICEHL). Almqvist was drafted 210th overall by the Detroit Red Wings in the 2009 NHL entry draft.

== Playing career ==
=== Junior ===
In early November 2009, HV71 signed Almqvist to a three-year contract. Almqvist was the highest scoring junior player in the 2010 Elitserien playoffs, recording one goal and ten assists in 16 playoff games, to help lead HV71 to the Elitserien Championship. Almqvist's eleven postseason points lead all SEL defensemen.

=== Professional ===
On May 28, 2011, Almqvist signed a three-year entry-level contract with the Detroit Red Wings.

On March 30, 2012, Almqvist made his AHL debut in a game against the Charlotte Checkers.

During the 2012–13 AHL season, Almquist was the second-leading scorer amongst defensemen for the Griffins in his first pro season in North America. Almquist recorded 10 goals and 21 assists. The Griffins finished first in the Midwest Division and captured the Calder Cup championship. Almquist played in the team's first 21 playoff games before suffering an injury after crashing into the boards in Game 3 of the finals against the Syracuse Crunch. Almquist recorded 3 goals and 7 assists in the playoffs.

In November 2013, Almqvist was called up from the Grand Rapids Griffins as an injury replacement for Brendan Smith, and he made his NHL debut on November 4, in a game against the Winnipeg Jets. On November 7, in his second NHL game, Almqvist scored his first career NHL goal against Kari Lehtonen of the Dallas Stars.

At the conclusion of his entry-level contract and unable to gain a roster spot with the Red Wings, Almqvist left North America as a restricted free agent and signed a two-year contract with Severstal Cherepovets of the KHL on June 25, 2014.

After a successful two-year return to original club HV71, culminating in capturing the Le Mat trophy in the 2016–17 season, Almqvist left to sign a two-year contract with fellow SHL club, Frölunda HC on May 8, 2017.

Upon completing his contract with the Indians, Almqvist left the SHL to sign a one-year contract with Swiss club, SC Bern, of the National League on April 11, 2018. During the Final of the NL playoffs, while playing against EV Zug, Almqvist was assessed a match penalty in third period after an illegal charge against Reto Suri, resulting in a dangerous head injury on 11 April 2019. He contributed with 4 points in 13 games to help SC Bern win of the Swiss championship.

On 7 July 2019, Almqvist returned to Russia as a free agent, agreeing to a one-year KHL contract with Admiral Vladivostok. At the conclusion of his contract with Admiral entering a hiatus, Almqvist continued in the KHL joining Belarusian club, HC Dinamo Minsk, on a one-year contract on 20 July 2020.

Splitting the 2022–23 season between Traktor Chelyabinsk of the KHL and EV Zug of the National League, Almqvist continued his European career by signing a one-year deal in the German DEL with EHC München on 21 July 2023.

== Career statistics ==
			Regular season					Playoffs
Season	Team	League	GP	G	A	Pts	PIM	GP	G	A	Pts	PIM
2008–09	HV71	J20	41	8	28	36	44	6	1	5	6	4
2009–10	HV71	SEL	28	2	6	8	10	16	1	10	11	8
2009–10	HV71	J20	15	5	29	34	14	—	—	—	—	—
2010–11	HV71	SEL	52	0	16	16	32	2	0	0	0	0
2011–12	HV71	SEL	42	3	8	11	26	3	0	1	1	4
2011–12	Grand Rapids Griffins	AHL	3	0	0	0	0	—	—	—	—	—
2012–13	Grand Rapids Griffins	AHL	68	10	21	31	34	21	3	7	10	12
2013–14	Grand Rapids Griffins	AHL	73	4	49	53	56	1	0	0	0	0
2013–14	Detroit Red Wings	NHL	2	1	0	1	0	—	—	—	—	—
2014–15	Severstal Cherepovets	KHL	21	0	4	4	12	—	—	—	—	—
2015–16	HV71	SHL	47	6	13	19	30	6	0	2	2	6
2016–17	HV71	SHL	52	4	14	18	24	16	1	5	6	12
2017–18	Frölunda HC	SHL	50	6	23	29	34	6	1	0	1	4
2018–19	SC Bern	NL	50	1	14	15	20	13	1	3	4	29
2019–20	Admiral Vladivostok	KHL	58	8	18	26	34	—	—	—	—	—
2020–21	Dinamo Minsk	KHL	29	0	4	4	18	5	0	0	0	6
2021–22	Dinamo Minsk	KHL	41	3	23	26	36	3	1	1	2	2
2022–23	Traktor Chelyabinsk	KHL	25	1	1	2	12	—	—	—	—	—
2022–23	EV Zug	NL	17	2	9	11	6	1	0	0	0	0
2023–24	EHC Red Bull München	DEL	33	1	12	13	25	3	1	0	1	0
2024–25	Kölner Haie	DEL	51	5	19	24	38	15	0	3	3	4
SHL totals			231	22	94	116	176	55	4	19	23	34
NHL totals			2	1	0	1	0	—	—	—	—	—
KHL totals			174	12	50	62	112	8	1	1	2	8
NL totals			67	3	23	26	26	14	1	3	4	29
DEL totals			84	6	31	37	63	18	1	3	4	4

== Awards and honours ==
Award	Year
SHL
Le Mat Trophy (HV71)	2010, 2017
Best P Plus–minus	2011
AHL
Calder Cup (Grand Rapids Griffins)	2013
Second All-Star Team	2014
NL
Champion (SC Bern)	2019
