= Mitch Callahan =

American ice hockey player (born 1991)

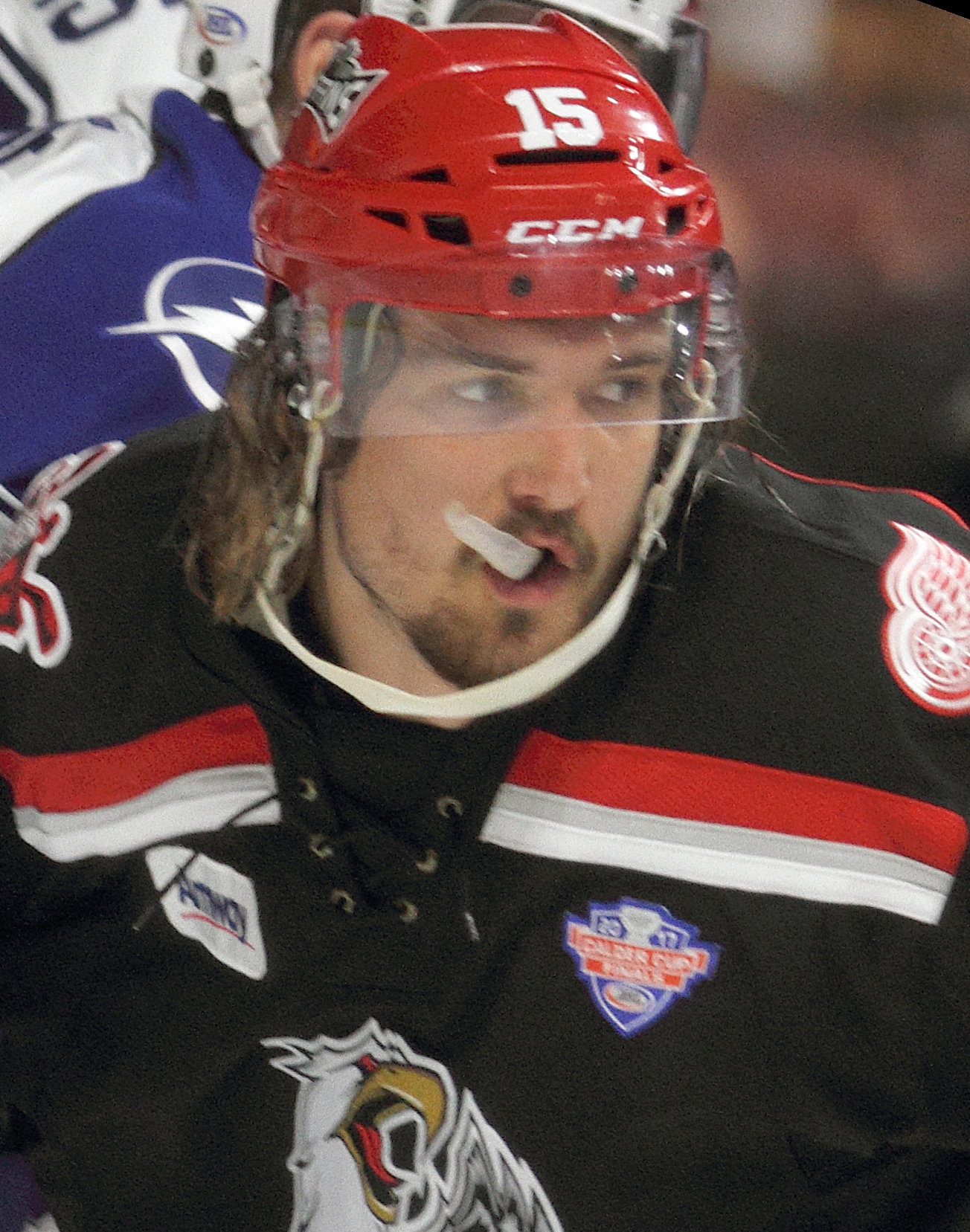
- Callahan with the Grand Rapids Griffins in 2017
- Born: August 17, 1991 (age 35) Whittier, California, U.S.
- Height: 6 ft 0 in (183 cm)
- Weight: 195 lb (88 kg; 13 st 13 lb)
- Position: Right wing
- Shot: Right
- Played for: Detroit Red Wings; Augsburger Panther; Rødovre Mighty Bulls
- NHL draft: 180th overall, 2009; Detroit Red Wings
- Playing career: 2011–2021

Mitchell Callahan (born August 17, 1991) is an American former professional ice hockey forward. He last played for Rødovre Mighty Bulls in the Danish Metal Ligaen. Callahan was drafted 180th overall by the Detroit Red Wings in the 2009 NHL entry draft.

== Playing career ==
=== Junior ===
During the 2008–09 season, Callahan was a member of the Kelowna Rockets team that won the Ed Chynoweth Cup, in his debut season with the club. During the 2010–11 season, Callahan helped Kelowna to a B.C. Division title, by finishing second among team leaders with 23 goals, and third among team leaders with 31 assists. Callahan was named the Western Hockey League player of the week for the week ending November 6, 2010, after recording five goals and seven assists in four games. During Callahan's three seasons with the Kelowna Rockets, he registered 57 goals, 128 points, and 440 penalty minutes in 204 games played.

=== Professional ===
On May 4, 2010, the Detroit Red Wings signed Callahan to a three-year entry-level contract.

Callahan made his AHL debut with the Grand Rapids Griffins on October 8, 2011. During his first professional season, which was limited to 48 games due to injuries, Callahan finished second among AHL rookies with 14 fighting majors.

During the 2012–13 season, Callahan skated in 71 of 76 games in his second season in the AHL. On January 19, 2013, Callahan recorded his first professional hat-trick in a game against the Rockford IceHogs. Callahan tied for the team lead in the Calder Cup Finals with five points, helping lead the Griffins to the Calder Cup.

On March 25, 2014, Callahan made his NHL debut for the Detroit Red Wings in a game against the Columbus Blue Jackets.

During the 2013–14 season, Callahan skated in 70 games in his third season in the AHL and finished among the Griffins' leading scorers with 26 goals (2nd) and 44 points (4th).

On July 17, 2014, the Detroit Red Wings signed Callahan to a one-year contract.

During the 2014–15 season, Callahan recorded 16 goals and 22 assists in 48 games during his fourth season in the AHL, before a knee injury sidelined him for the remainder of the season.

On July 13, 2015, the Detroit Red Wings signed Callahan to a one-year contract extension.

On July 21, 2016, the Detroit Red Wings signed Callahan to a one-year contract extension. On March 1, 2017, Callahan was recalled by the Red Wings. Before being recalled, he recorded 14 goals and 22 assists in 53 games for the Griffins. On March 20, Callahan was returned to the Griffins. During the 2016–17 season, Callahan recorded 16 goals and 27 assists in 66 regular season games for the Griffins. During the 2017 Calder Cup playoffs he recorded six goals and 10 assists in 19 playoff games, to help lead the Griffins to the Calder Cup.

On July 1, 2017, Callahan left the Red Wings and signed a two-year, two-way contract with the Edmonton Oilers. On February 13, 2018, Callahan was suspended 20 games for violating terms of the American Hockey League/Professional Hockey Players' Association Performance Enhancing Substances Program.

After his contract with the Oilers, having played exclusively with the Bakersfield Condors of the AHL, Callahan opted to pursue a European career, agreeing to a one-year contract with German outfit, Augsburger Panther of the DEL, on July 19, 2019.

== International play ==
Medal record

Representing United States

Ice hockey

World Junior Championships
Bronze medal – third place	2011 USA	

Callahan represented the United States at the 2011 World Junior Ice Hockey Championships, where he won a bronze medal. Callahan's only goal in the tournament was a game-winning goal against Switzerland in the final preliminary-round game to give the team a bye into the medal round.

== Career statistics ==
=== Regular season and playoffs ===
			Regular season					Playoffs
Season	Team	League	GP	G	A	Pts	PIM	GP	G	A	Pts	PIM
2008–09	Kelowna Rockets	WHL	70	14	13	27	188	22	1	3	4	43
2009–10	Kelowna Rockets	WHL	72	20	27	47	165	12	2	4	6	10
2010–11	Kelowna Rockets	WHL	62	23	31	54	87	10	5	4	9	17
2011–12	Grand Rapids Griffins	AHL	48	6	3	9	103	—	—	—	—	—
2012–13	Grand Rapids Griffins	AHL	71	11	9	20	93	24	6	5	11	33
2013–14	Grand Rapids Griffins	AHL	70	26	18	44	51	8	1	4	5	6
2013–14	Detroit Red Wings	NHL	1	0	0	0	0	—	—	—	—	—
2014–15	Grand Rapids Griffins	AHL	48	16	22	38	24	—	—	—	—	—
2015–16	Grand Rapids Griffins	AHL	62	19	13	32	94	9	0	2	2	9
2016–17	Grand Rapids Griffins	AHL	66	16	27	43	57	19	6	10	16	18
2016–17	Detroit Red Wings	NHL	4	0	0	0	0	—	—	—	—	—
2017–18	Bakersfield Condors	AHL	45	2	7	9	23	—	—	—	—	—
2018–19	Bakersfield Condors	AHL	61	15	19	34	22	9	1	0	1	4
2019–20	Augsburger Panther	DEL	25	1	4	5	48	—	—	—	—	—
2020-21	Rødovre Mighty Bulls	Denmark	6	1	0	1	6	—	—	—	—	—
NHL totals			5	0	0	0	0	—	—	—	—	—

=== International ===
Year	Team	Event	Result	GP	G	A	Pts	PIM
2011	United States	WJC	3rd place, bronze medalist(s)	6	1	0	1	2
Junior totals				6	1	0	1	2

== Awards and honors ==
Award	Year
AHL
Calder Cup (Grand Rapids Griffins)	2013, 2017
