= Jamie Tardif =

Canadian ice hockey player (born 1985)

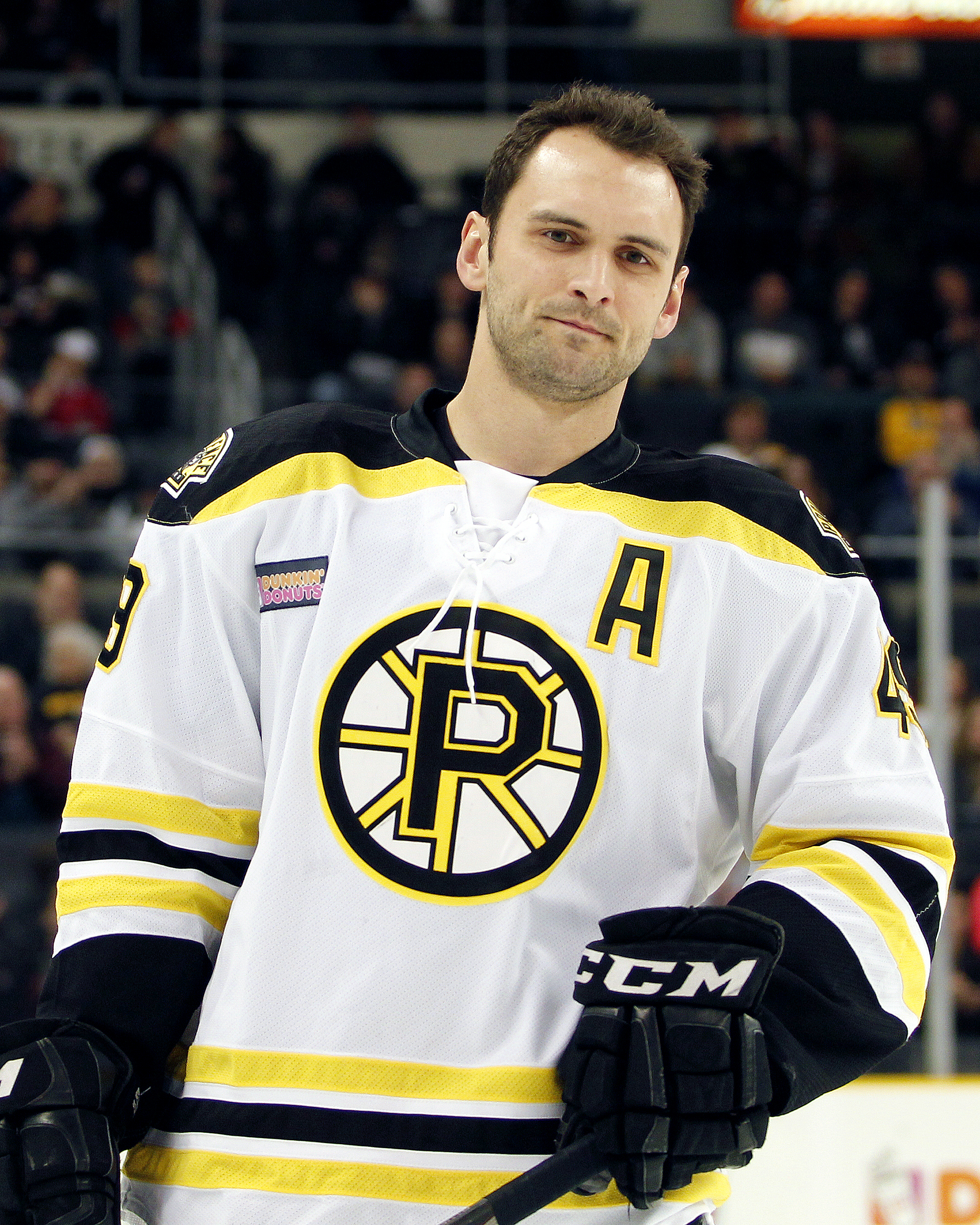
- Born: January 23, 1985 (age 41) Welland, Ontario, Canada
- Height: 6 ft 0 in (183 cm)
- Weight: 205 lb (93 kg; 14 st 9 lb)
- Position: Right wing
- Shot: Right
- Played for: Boston Bruins; Adler Mannheim
- NHL draft: 112th overall, 2003; Calgary Flames
- Playing career: 2006–2018

Jamie Marc Tardif (born January 23, 1985) is a Canadian former professional ice hockey forward. Tardif most recently served as the assistant coach for the Hartford Wolfpack of the American Hockey League (AHL). Tardif played briefly in the National Hockey League (NHL) for the Boston Bruins appearing in two games.

== Playing career ==
Tardif was drafted 112th overall in the 2003 NHL entry draft by the Calgary Flames. He played Junior with the Peterborough Petes of the Ontario Hockey League from 2001 to 2006. Unsigned from the Flames, Tardif re-entered the 2005 NHL entry draft and was passed over.

In the 2006–07 season, Tardif made his professional debut signing with the Toledo Storm of the ECHL. Through the duration of the season Tardif signed professional try-out contracts with the Manitoba Moose and Iowa Stars before finishing out the season with the Grand Rapids Griffins.

On July 26, 2007, Tardif signed with the Griffins for the 2007–08 season. On April 15, 2008, after scoring 17 goals and 34 points, Jamie then signed a two-year entry-level contract with the Griffins NHL affiliate, the Detroit Red Wings.

Jamie re-signed with the Red Wings on August 8, 2010 to a two-way one-year contract.

On July 5, 2011, Tardif signed a two-year contract with the Boston Bruins. In the second year of his contract in the 2012–13 season, Tardif was recalled from the Bruins' AHL affiliate in Providence and made his NHL debut in his hometown Toronto, in a 1-0 victory over the Maple Leafs on February 2, 2013. Tardif was promoted after an injury to Brad Marchand.

On August 5, 2013, Tardif signed as a free agent to a one-year contract with the Buffalo Sabres. After participating in the Sabres training camp he was assigned to AHL affiliate, the Rochester Americans, where he posted 18 goals and 37 points in 51 games in the 2013–14 season.

Tardif left the Sabres organization in the off-season and on July 10, 2014, signed his first contract abroad on a one-year deal with German club, Adler Mannheim of the DEL.

Tardif enjoyed three seasons with Adler Mannheim before leaving as a free agent to return to North America. Approaching the tail end of his playing career, Tardif signed an ECHL contract to be a player/assistant coach with the Quad City Mallards of the ECHL on August 31, 2017. In the 2017–18 season, Tardif contributed with 32 points in 53 games. He played injured in the last ever regular season game of the Mallards, who had earlier announced they would cease operations, and announced his retirement after 12 professional years on April 7, 2018.

== Coaching Career ==
On July 28, 2018, the Sault Ste. Marie Greyhounds announced that they had hired Tardif as the new assistant coach. Tardif served in the role for four seasons.

On August 29, 2022, the Hartford Wolfpack of the American Hockey League (AHL) announced that they had name Tardif as one of the assistant coaches for the team.

On May 3, 2026, The Wolfpack announced that they had fired Tardif alongside fellow assistant coach Paul Mara and head coach Grant Potulny.

== Career statistics ==
=== Regular season and Playoffs ===
			Regular season					Playoffs
Season	Team	League	GP	G	A	Pts	PIM	GP	G	A	Pts	PIM
2000–01	Welland Cougars	GHL	47	28	34	62	73	—	—	—	—	—
2001–02	Peterborough Petes	OHL	64	22	22	44	30	6	0	1	1	2
2002–03	Peterborough Petes	OHL	68	31	29	60	32	7	3	4	7	0
2003–04	Peterborough Petes	OHL	64	25	28	53	56	—	—	—	—	—
2004–05	Peterborough Petes	OHL	66	37	28	65	84	14	8	3	11	14
2005–06	Peterborough Petes	OHL	62	40	29	69	108	19	6	6	12	18
2006–07	Toledo Storm	ECHL	34	10	20	30	37	—	—	—	—	—
2006–07	Manitoba Moose	AHL	1	0	0	0	0	—	—	—	—	—
2006–07	Iowa Stars	AHL	2	0	0	0	0	—	—	—	—	—
2006–07	Grand Rapids Griffins	AHL	27	9	6	15	18	2	0	0	0	0
2007–08	Grand Rapids Griffins	AHL	80	17	17	34	90	—	—	—	—	—
2008–09	Grand Rapids Griffins	AHL	55	9	9	18	43	10	2	0	2	8
2009–10	Grand Rapids Griffins	AHL	77	16	17	33	90	—	—	—	—	—
2010–11	Grand Rapids Griffins	AHL	77	27	27	54	81	—	—	—	—	—
2011–12	Providence Bruins	AHL	57	15	15	30	28	—	—	—	—	—
2012–13	Providence Bruins	AHL	62	30	15	45	48	12	7	4	11	10
2012–13	Boston Bruins	NHL	2	0	0	0	0	—	—	—	—	—
2013–14	Rochester Americans	AHL	51	18	19	37	28	3	0	1	1	4
2014–15	Adler Mannheim	DEL	43	15	11	26	46	8	1	1	2	2
2015–16	Adler Mannheim	DEL	37	8	16	24	64	—	—	—	—	—
2016–17	Adler Mannheim	DEL	24	3	5	8	26	3	0	0	0	0
2017–18	Quad City Mallards	ECHL	53	13	19	32	18	—	—	—	—	—
AHL totals			489	141	125	266	426	27	9	5	14	22
NHL totals			2	0	0	0	0	—	—	—	—	—

Medal record

Representing Canada

Ice hockey

IIHF U18 Championships
Gold medal – first place	2003 Yaroslavl	

=== International ===
Year	Team	Event	Result	GP	G	A	Pts	PIM
2002	Canada	U18	1st place, gold medalist(s)	5	2	0	2	12
2003	Canada	WJC18	1st place, gold medalist(s)	7	1	4	5	12
Junior totals				12	3	4	7	24
