= Tomáš Tatar =

Slovak ice hockey player (born 1990)

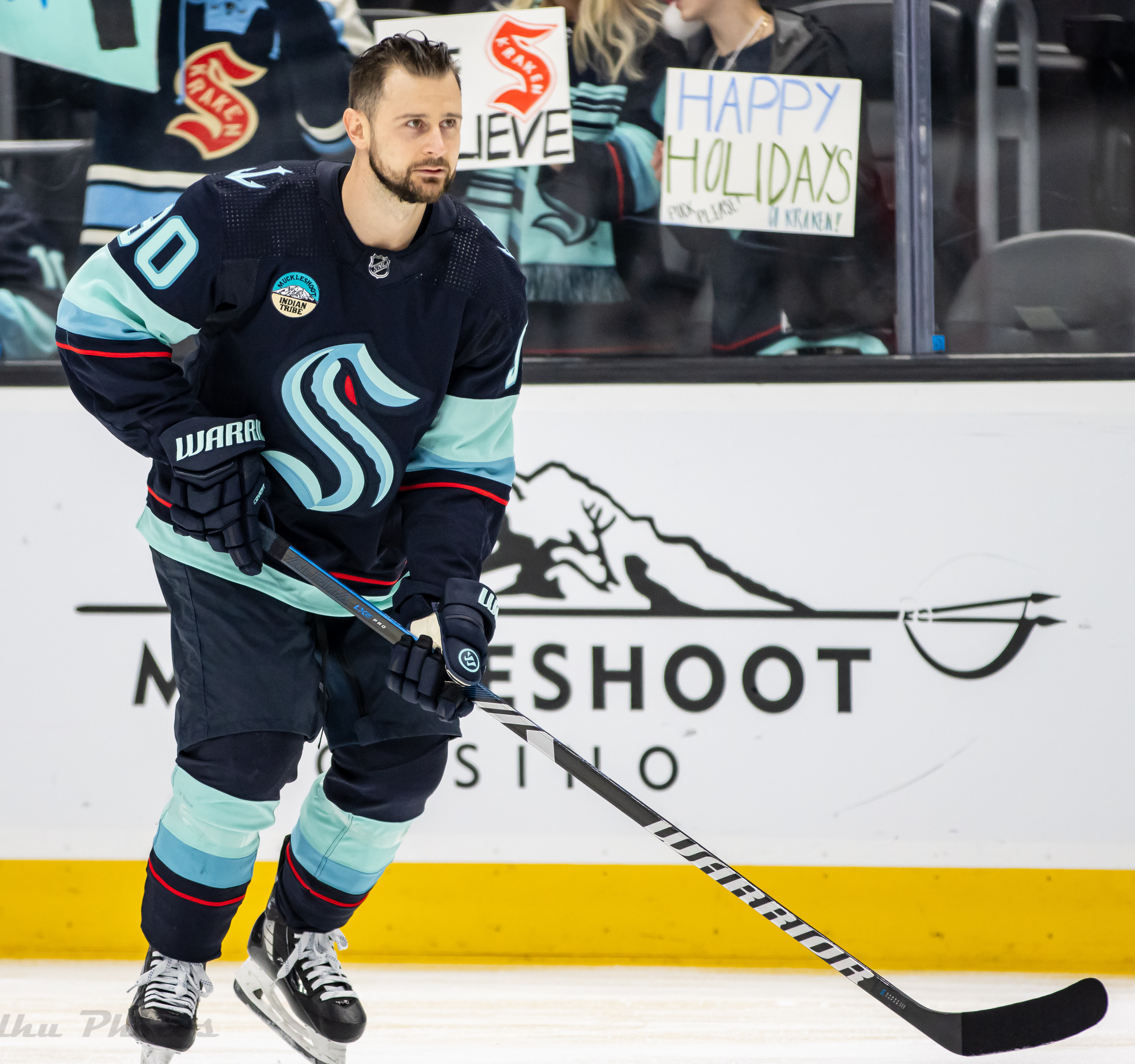
- Tatar with the Seattle Kraken in 2023
- Born: 1 December 1990 (age 35) Ilava, Czechoslovakia
- Height: 5 ft 10 in (178 cm)
- Weight: 173 lb (78 kg; 12 st 5 lb)
- Position: Forward
- Shoots: Left
- NL team Former teams: EV Zug; HKM Zvolen; Detroit Red Wings; ŠHK 37 Piešťany; Vegas Golden Knights; Montreal Canadiens; Colorado Avalanche; Seattle Kraken; New Jersey Devils
- National team: Slovakia
- NHL draft: 60th overall, 2009; Detroit Red Wings
- Playing career: 2009–present

Tomáš Tatar (Slovak pronunciation: [ˈtɔmaːʂ ˈtatar]; born 1 December 1990) is a Slovak professional ice hockey player who is a forward for EV Zug of the National League. Tatar was drafted 60th overall by the Detroit Red Wings in the 2009 NHL entry draft.

== Playing career ==
=== Slovak Extraliga ===
During the 2007–08 season, Tatar saw time with Dukla Trenčín's U18 and U20 squads, finishing the season with a combined 50 goals and 39 assists in 46 games.

During the 2008–09 season, Tatar's first season in the senior Slovak hockey system, he played for HKM Zvolen in the Slovak Extraliga, recording seven goals and eight assists in 48 games.

=== NHL ===
==== Detroit Red Wings ====
Tatar was drafted 60th overall by the Detroit Red Wings in the 2009 NHL entry draft. He was also drafted 15th overall by SKA Saint Petersburg in the 2009 KHL Entry Draft. On 25 September 2009, Tatar signed a three-year, entry-level contract with the Red Wings. After signing with Detroit, Tatar was assigned to their American Hockey League (AHL) affiliate, the Grand Rapids Griffins.

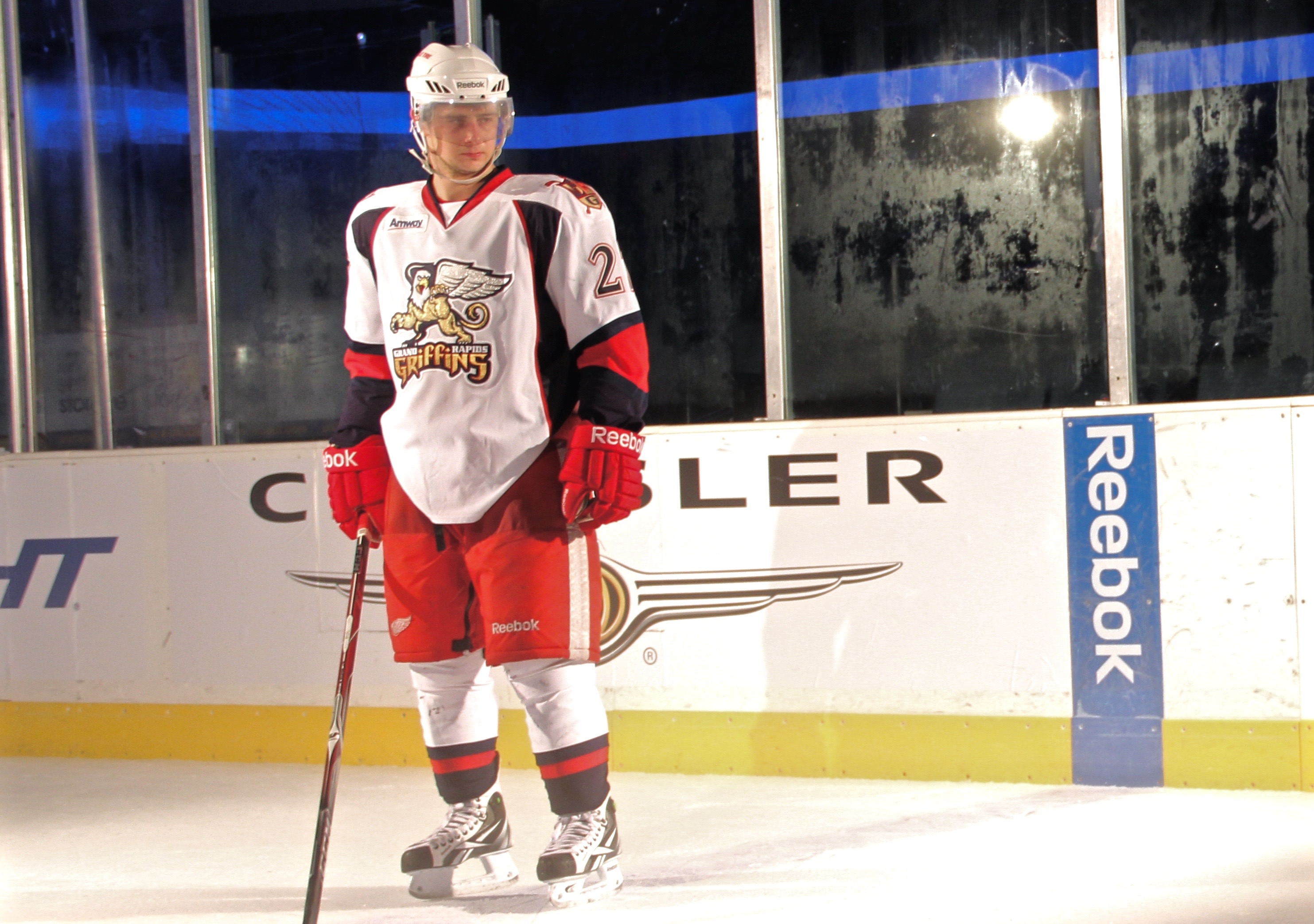
Tatar with the Grand Rapids Griffins in 2010.

During the 2009–10 season, his first in North America, Tatar recorded 16 goals and 16 assists in 58 games with Grand Rapids in his rookie season.

During the 2010–11 season, in his second professional season, Tatar recorded 24 goals and 33 assists in 70 games with the Griffins.

Tatar made his NHL debut on 31 December 2010, where he scored his first NHL goal against Dwayne Roloson of the New York Islanders.

During the 2011–12 season, Tatar was the leading scorer for the Griffins in his third professional season. Skating in all 76 games for the Griffins, he scored 24 goals and 34 assists, however the Griffins failed to make the Calder Cup playoffs, finishing fourth in the North Division.

During the 2012–13 season, Tatar played for three teams. Due to the 2012–13 NHL lockout, he started the season with the ŠHK 37 Piešťany in Slovakia, where he played eight games and recorded five goals and five assists. Following the lockout, Tatar played in 18 games for the Red Wings, recording four goals and three assists. He then ended the season with Grand Rapids, where he won the Calder Cup as the AHL champions. Tatar was the leading scorer for the Griffins during the playoffs, scoring 16 goals and five assists in 24 games, and was awarded the Jack A. Butterfield Trophy for Most Valuable Player in the 2013 playoffs.

During the 2013–14 season, in his first full NHL season, Tatar finished the season with 39 points, ranking second on the team in goals with 19.

On 28 July 2014, the Red Wings signed Tatar to a three-year, $8.25 million contract extension.

Tatar was named the Second Star of the Week for the week ending 24 November 2014. He tied for second in the NHL with four goals and one assist, including two game-winning goals, to lead the Red Wings to two victories in three games. He was also named the Second Star of the Week for the week ending 19 January 2015; he tied for first in the League with five goals and two assists, scoring in four straight games, to lead the Red Wings to four-straight victories.

On 21 July 2017, the Red Wings signed Tatar to a four-year, $21.2 million contract extension.

==== Vegas Golden Knights ====
On 26 February 2018, Tatar was traded to the Vegas Golden Knights in exchange for a first-round pick in 2018, a second-round pick in 2019 and a third-round pick in 2021. During the 2018 playoffs, Tatar played in eight games, tallying one goal and one assist.

==== Montreal Canadiens ====
Prior to the 2018–19 season, Tatar was traded to the Montreal Canadiens, along with prospect Nick Suzuki and a second round draft pick in 2019, in exchange for their captain Max Pacioretty. He ended with the season with 58 points (25 goals and 33 assists) in 80 games played while playing the majority of the season on the teams second line with Andrew Shaw and Max Domi.

In the 2019–20 season, Tatar set a career high in points with 61 through 68 regular season games. Tatar typically played on Montreal's first line with Brendan Gallagher and Phillip Danault during the season.

In the Canadiens' cinderella run to the 2021 Stanley Cup Finals, Tatar was frequently a healthy scratch, playing only five games.

==== New Jersey Devils ====
On 5 August 2021, as a free agent from Montreal, Tatar signed a two-year, $9 million contract with the New Jersey Devils. In 158 regular season games with the Devils, Tatar scored 78 points. He was with the team for the 2023 Stanley Cup playoffs, scoring a goal in the decisive game 7 victory over the New York Rangers that secured their first playoff series win since 2012.

==== Colorado Avalanche and Seattle Kraken ====
On 12 September 2023, Tatar signed a one-year, $1.5 million contract with the Colorado Avalanche. He later revealed that he declined a one-year contract offer to stay in New Jersey, looking instead for a multi-year deal, and when he was unable to find one there was no longer an offer from the Devils due to their acquisition of Tyler Toffoli. Tatar made his Avalanche debut on the opening night of the 2023–24 season, registering an assist in a 5–2 victory over the Los Angeles Kings on 11 October. Slated to play in a top-six role, Tatar struggled to contribute offensively, scoring his lone goal with the Avalanche in his 26th game during a 6–5 victory over the Calgary Flames on 11 December.

Having posted nine points through 27 games, Tatar was traded by the Avalanche to the Seattle Kraken in exchange for a 2024 fifth-round pick on 15 December. Tatar made his debut with the Kraken in an elevated role on the top-line alongside Matty Beniers and Jared McCann and saw his shootout attempt foiled in a 3–2 defeat to the Los Angeles Kings on 16 December 2023.

==== Return to New Jersey ====
As a free agent for a second consecutive year, Tatar opted to return to the Devils by signing a one-year, $1.8 million contract with the team on 2 July 2024.

=== Switzerland ===
In 2025, after 14 seasons in the NHL, Tatar signed a two-year contract with EV Zug of the Swiss National League. While Tatar played predominantly on the left wing for the majority of his career, Zug announced he would be used as a centre.

== International play ==
Medal record

Men's ice hockey

Representing Slovakia

World Championships
Silver medal – second place	2012 Finland	

Tatar represented Slovakia at the 2009 World Junior Ice Hockey Championships, where he was the team's leading-scorer, and finished tied for fourth in tournament scoring, recording seven goals and four assists in seven games. Tatar again represented Slovakia at the 2010 World Junior Ice Hockey Championships, where he scored three goals and two assists in six games. That same year, he also represented the senior Slovak team at the 2010 IIHF World Championship, scoring two goals in six games.

Tatar also played for Slovakia at the 2012 IIHF World Championship, where he was the youngest player on the roster. He skated in all ten games for the silver medal-winning Slovakia at the World Championships, finishing with two goals and three assists. Slovakia finished second to Russia after defeating the Czech Republic in the semifinals.

Tatar was then selected to play for Slovakia at the 2014 Winter Olympics in Sochi, Russia, where he finished the tournament as the squad's second-leading scorer, with one goal and one assist. Tatar also represented Slovakia later that year at the 2014 IIHF World Championship, where he was the team's second-leading scorer, recording four goals and four assists in seven games.

Tatar represented Slovakia at the 2015 IIHF World Championship, where he recorded two assists in six games.

Tatar represented Team Europe at the 2016 World Cup of Hockey, where he was the team's leading goal scorer, recording three goals in six games, including an overtime goal against Sweden in the semifinal and won a silver medal.

== Personal life ==
Tatar is a supporter of FC Bayern Munich.

== Career statistics ==
=== Regular season and playoffs ===
			Regular season					Playoffs
Season	Team	League	GP	G	A	Pts	PIM	GP	G	A	Pts	PIM
2005–06	Spartak Dubnica nad Váhom	SVK U18	35	8	12	20	14	—	—	—	—	—
2006–07	Spartak Dubnica nad Váhom	SVK.2 U18	48	33	44	77	42	—	—	—	—	—
2006–07	Spartak Dubnica nad Váhom	SVK U20	6	3	0	3	2	—	—	—	—	—
2007–08	Dukla Trenčín	SVK U18	4	9	4	13	0	—	—	—	—	—
2007–08	Dukla Trenčín	SVK U20	42	31	45	76	32	—	—	—	—	—
2008–09	HKM Zvolen	SVK	48	7	8	15	20	13	5	3	8	4
2008–09	HC 07 Detva	SVK.2	1	1	1	2	2	—	—	—	—	—
2009–10	Grand Rapids Griffins	AHL	58	16	16	32	12	—	—	—	—	—
2010–11	Grand Rapids Griffins	AHL	70	24	33	57	45	—	—	—	—	—
2010–11	Detroit Red Wings	NHL	9	1	0	1	0	—	—	—	—	—
2011–12	Grand Rapids Griffins	AHL	76	24	34	58	45	—	—	—	—	—
2012–13	ŠHK 37 Piešťany	SVK	8	5	5	10	6	—	—	—	—	—
2012–13	Grand Rapids Griffins	AHL	61	23	26	49	50	24	16	5	21	23
2012–13	Detroit Red Wings	NHL	18	4	3	7	4	—	—	—	—	—
2013–14	Detroit Red Wings	NHL	73	19	20	39	30	5	0	0	0	10
2014–15	Detroit Red Wings	NHL	82	29	27	56	28	7	3	1	4	2
2015–16	Detroit Red Wings	NHL	81	21	24	45	24	5	0	3	3	2
2016–17	Detroit Red Wings	NHL	82	25	21	46	26	—	—	—	—	—
2017–18	Detroit Red Wings	NHL	62	16	12	28	24	—	—	—	—	—
2017–18	Vegas Golden Knights	NHL	20	4	2	6	10	8	1	1	2	2
2018–19	Montreal Canadiens	NHL	80	25	33	58	34	—	—	—	—	—
2019–20	Montreal Canadiens	NHL	68	22	39	61	36	10	2	0	2	4
2020–21	Montreal Canadiens	NHL	50	10	20	30	8	5	0	1	1	2
2021–22	New Jersey Devils	NHL	76	15	15	30	22	—	—	—	—	—
2022–23	New Jersey Devils	NHL	82	20	28	48	30	12	1	0	1	4
2023–24	Colorado Avalanche	NHL	27	1	8	9	10	—	—	—	—	—
2023–24	Seattle Kraken	NHL	43	8	7	15	10	—	—	—	—	—
2024–25	New Jersey Devils	NHL	74	7	10	17	20	4	0	0	0	2
2025–26	EV Zug	NL	41	8	25	33	39	7	1	2	3	2
NHL totals			927	227	269	496	316	56	7	6	13	26

=== International ===
Year	Team	Event	Result	GP	G	A	Pts	PIM
2009	Slovakia	WJC	4th	7	7	4	11	4
2010	Slovakia	WJC	8th	6	3	2	5	6
2010	Slovakia	WC	12th	6	2	0	2	4
2012	Slovakia	WC	2nd place, silver medalist(s)	10	2	3	5	0
2014	Slovakia	OG	11th	4	1	1	2	2
2014	Slovakia	WC	9th	7	4	4	8	6
2015	Slovakia	WC	9th	6	0	2	2	6
2016	Team Europe	WCH	2nd	6	3	0	3	0
2019	Slovakia	WC	9th	7	2	4	6	4
2022	Slovakia	WC	8th	8	3	3	6	2
2024	Slovakia	WC	7th	8	1	5	6	8
2024	Slovakia	OGQ	Q	3	1	0	1	2
2026	Slovakia	OG	4th	6	2	1	3	4
Junior totals				13	10	6	16	10
Senior totals				71	21	23	44	38
