= Cédrick Desjardins =

Canadian ice hockey player (born 1985)

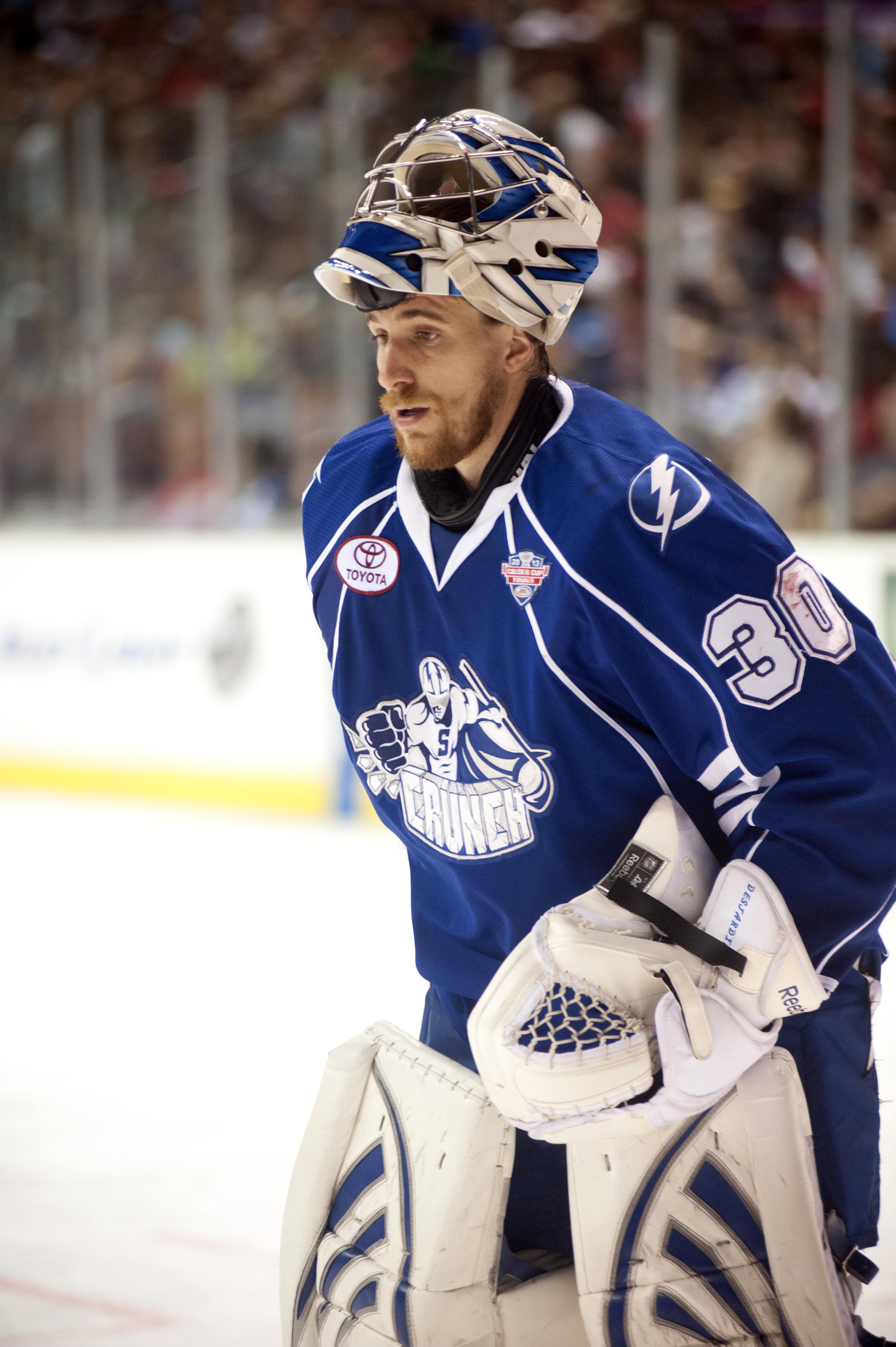
- Desjardins with the Syracuse Crunch in 2013
- Born: September 30, 1985 (age 41) Edmundston, New Brunswick, Canada
- Height: 6 ft 0 in (183 cm)
- Weight: 192 lb (87 kg; 13 st 10 lb)
- Position: Goaltender
- Caught: Left
- Played for: Tampa Bay Lightning
- NHL draft: Undrafted
- Playing career: 2006–2020

Cédrick Desjardins (born September 30, 1985) is a Canadian former professional ice hockey goaltender. He played with the Tampa Bay Lightning of the National Hockey League (NHL).

== Playing career ==
=== Juniors ===
Cédrick Desjardins (nicknamed Cédrick the Entertainer) was drafted in 2002 by the Rimouski Océanic in the QMJHL, 200th overall. He started his career in the QMJHL in 2002–03 with the Rimouski Océanic. He had 1 win in 23 games.

In the 2004–05 QMJHL season, he became the number one goalie on the team, leading the Océanic, along with the forward Sidney Crosby, to the Memorial Cup final, where they lost 4–0 to the London Knights.

In the off-season, Desjardins was traded to the Quebec Remparts. Undrafted and as a 20-year-old player that meant it was his last year in the QMJHL. In the QMJHL finals against the Moncton Wildcats, they lost the series 4–2, but they went to the Memorial Cup tournament because Moncton was the host team. In the Memorial Cup finals against the Wildcats, Desjardins stopped 46 of 48 shots on the way to a 6–2 win and the 2006 Memorial Cup. He also won the Hap Emms Memorial Trophy as the most valuable goaltender at the tournament.

=== Professional ===
In 2006, Desjardins was invited to the Chicago Blackhawks training camp before signing a two-year contract with the Hamilton Bulldogs of the American Hockey League on July 26, 2006. For the 2006–07 season on October 11, 2006, the Bulldogs assigned Desjardins to the Cincinnati Cyclones of the ECHL in which after his first week as a professional he was named the ECHL's "Reebok" player of the week. He was re-called to the Hamilton Bulldogs on December 5, 2007, when Jaroslav Halak was called up to the NHL's Montreal Canadiens. He was again called up on February 26, 2008, following Montreal's trade of Cristobal Huet.

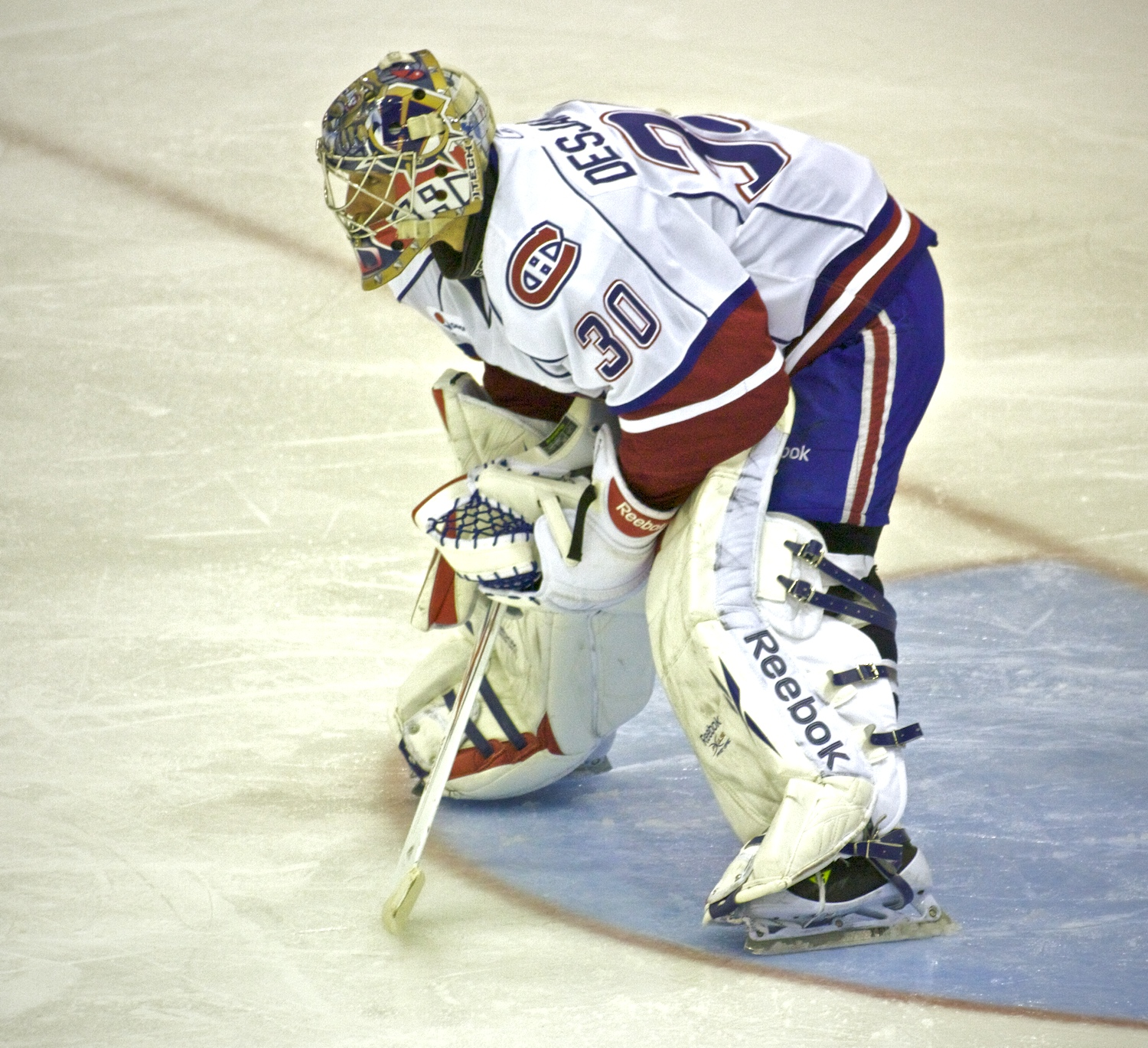
Desjardins playing for the Hamilton Bulldogs.

In the ensuing 2007–08 season Desjardins played a further 12 games with the Bulldogs but primarily helped the Cyclones win the 2008 ECHL Kelly Cup Championship, and for his efforts won the Kelly Cup Playoffs MVP Award.

During the 2009–10 season, Desjardins had a stellar year with the Hamilton Bulldogs. He played in 47 games and had an astounding 29-9-4 record with 6 shutouts and leading the league with a 2.00 Goals against average to win the Harry "Hap" Holmes Memorial Award. Desjardins also appeared in the AHL All-Star Game in which he was named the top goaltender in the skills competition and at season's end he earned selection to the AHL Second All-Star Team.

On July 20, 2010, Desjardins re-signed to a one-year contract with the Canadiens. However, on August 16, 2010, he was traded by the Canadiens to the Tampa Bay Lightning for Karri Rämö. On December 30, 2010, he started his first NHL game, playing against the Canadiens. He recorded a win, stopping 27 of 28 shots for a 4-1 Lightning victory.

On July 8, 2011, Desjardins signed a one-year contract with the Colorado Avalanche. After starting the 2011–12 season injured from off-season shoulder surgery, Desjardins was assigned to affiliate, the Lake Erie Monsters, upon recovery. Throughout the season Desjardins was plagued by injury, however in 32 games with the Monsters, Desjardins set Monsters season records in save percentage and goals against average, while also selected as Lake Erie's lone All-Star representative in the 2012 AHL All-Star game. On February 16, Desjardins was briefly recalled by Colorado to serve as the backup goalie in place of the injured Jean-Sébastien Giguère, however never played with the Avalanche.

On July 1, 2012, Desjardins signed a one-year, two-way contract to return to his original NHL team, the Montreal Canadiens. Reassigned to his familiar stomping grounds in Hamilton to start the 2012–13 season, Desjardins suffered from injury and registered only 7 wins in 22 games for the cellar dwelling Bulldogs.

On February 14, 2013, Desjardins again retraced his footsteps when he was traded from the Canadiens to the Tampa Bay Lightning for a second time in exchange for another goalie, Dustin Tokarski.

On July 1, 2014, Desjardins left the Lightning organization for a second time and signed a two-year two-way contract with the New York Rangers.

On December 26, 2014, while playing for the New York Rangers AHL affiliate, the Hartford Wolfpack, he tore his ACL, ending his season. On December 8, 2015, almost a full year after sustaining his injury, Desjardins was cleared to play and assigned to begin his 2015-16 campaign with the Manchester Monarchs of the ECHL to begin his comeback from rehabilitation.

== Career statistics ==
			Regular season										Playoffs
Season	Team	League	GP	W	L	T	OTL	MIN	GA	SO	GAA	SV%	GP	W	L	MIN	GA	SO	GAA	SV%
2002–03	Rimouski Océanic	QMJHL	23	1	19	0	—	1239	109	0	5.28	.870	—	—	—	—	—	—	—	—
2003–04	Rimouski Océanic	QMJHL	20	8	11	0	—	1119	72	0	3.86	.901	1	0	0	14	0	0	0.00	1.000
2004–05	Rimouski Océanic	QMJHL	44	30	7	4	—	2439	120	2	2.95	.909	13	12	1	767	34	1	2.66	.926
2005–06	Quebec Remparts	QMJHL	41	28	10	—	0	2254	111	5	2.95	.906	23	14	9	1413	60	1	2.55	.927
2006–07	Cincinnati Cyclones	ECHL	44	24	19	—	1	2648	112	4	2.54	.917	10	6	4	595	28	2	2.82	.913
2006–07	Hamilton Bulldogs	AHL	3	0	2	—	0	142	7	0	2.96	.879	—	—	—	—	—	—	—	—
2007–08	Cincinnati Cyclones	ECHL	22	16	4	—	2	1285	41	5	1.92	.934	16	11	4	947	29	1	1.84	.939
2007–08	Hamilton Bulldogs	AHL	12	4	3	—	2	572	29	0	3.04	.909	—	—	—	—	—	—	—	—
2008–09	Hamilton Bulldogs	AHL	30	16	12	—	0	1718	73	4	2.55	.919	—	—	—	—	—	—	—	—
2009–10	Hamilton Bulldogs	AHL	47	29	9	—	4	2576	86	6	2.00	.919	10	6	4	596	26	1	2.62	.902
2010–11	Norfolk Admirals	AHL	24	15	6	—	1	1391	60	1	2.59	.905	—	—	—	—	—	—	—	—
2010–11	Tampa Bay Lightning	NHL	2	2	0	—	0	120	2	0	1.00	.968	—	—	—	—	—	—	—	—
2011–12	Lake Erie Monsters	AHL	32	16	11	—	5	1936	68	3	2.11	.932	—	—	—	—	—	—	—	—
2012–13	Hamilton Bulldogs	AHL	22	7	13	—	2	1285	63	2	2.94	.905	—	—	—	—	—	—	—	—
2012–13	Syracuse Crunch	AHL	14	8	5	—	1	851	30	3	2.12	.918	18	13	5	1098	42	3	2.30	.908
2012–13	Tampa Bay Lightning	NHL	3	0	3	—	0	160	8	0	3.00	.890	—	—	—	—	—	—	—	—
2013–14	Syracuse Crunch	AHL	35	9	18	—	4	1984	93	2	2.81	.900	—	—	—	—	—	—	—	—
2013–14	Tampa Bay Lightning	NHL	1	0	1	—	0	18	2	0	6.67	.846	—	—	—	—	—	—	—	—
2014–15	Hartford Wolf Pack	AHL	15	8	3	—	1	800	35	1	2.63	.910	—	—	—	—	—	—	—	—
2015–16	Manchester Monarchs	ECHL	5	2	2	—	0	242	11	0	2.73	.901	—	—	—	—	—	—	—	—
2015–16	Indy Fuel	ECHL	1	1	0	—	0	48	2	0	2.52	.931	—	—	—	—	—	—	—	—
2016–17	Jonquière Marquis	LNAH	17	—	—	—	—	977	41	0	2.52	.904	15	—	—	—	—	—	2.19	.917
2017–18	Jonquière Marquis	LNAH	28	—	—	—	—	1564	81	0	3.11	.901	5	—	—	—	—	—	2.01	.922
2018–19	Jonquière Marquis	LNAH	29	17	12	—	0	—	—	—	3.57	.903	21	9	12	—	—	—	3.46	.905
2019–20	Jonquière Marquis	LNAH	27	10	16	—	0	1485	98	0	3.96	.885	—	—	—	—	—	—	—	—
NHL totals			6	2	4	—	0	298	12	0	2.41	.920	—	—	—	—	—	—	—	—

== Awards and honours ==
Award	Year
CHL
QMJHL Champion	2004–05
Memorial Cup Champion	2005–06
Memorial Cup All-Star Team	2005–06
Memorial Cup Hap Emms Memorial Trophy	2005–06
ECHL
Kelly Cup Champion	2007–08
Kelly Cup Playoffs MVP	2007–08
AHL
Second All-Star Team	2009–10
Harry "Hap" Holmes Memorial Award	2009–10
