= Will Acton =

American-Canadian ice hockey player (born 1987)

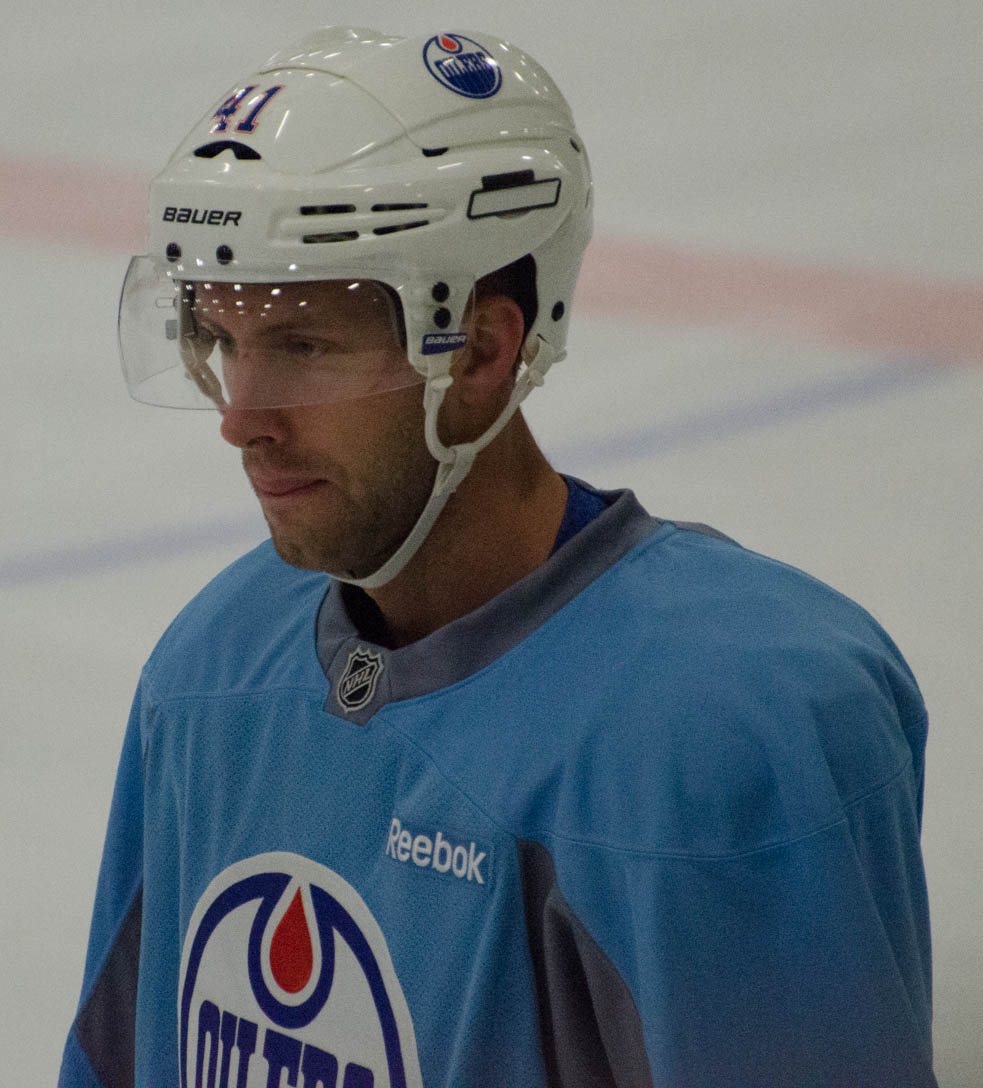
- Acton at the 2014 Edmonton Oilers training camp
- Born: July 16, 1987 (age 38) Edina, Minnesota, U.S.
- Height: 6 ft 3 in (191 cm)
- Weight: 202 lb (92 kg; 14 st 6 lb)
- Position: Centre
- Shot: Left
- Played for: Edmonton Oilers; Schwenninger Wild Wings; Thomas Sabo Ice Tigers
- NHL draft: Undrafted
- Playing career: 2011–2020

William Kevin Acton (born July 16, 1987) is an American-born Canadian former professional ice hockey player who played with the Edmonton Oilers in the National Hockey League (NHL).

== Playing career ==
Acton attended Lake Superior State University where he played four seasons of NCAA hockey with Lakers where he scored 77 points and registered 132 penalty minutes in 144 games played.

In March 2011, the Toronto Marlies of the American Hockey League (AHL) signed Acton to an amateur tryout contract to begin his professional career.

On July 5, 2013, the Edmonton Oilers signed Acton as a free agent to a two-year, two-way contract.

Acton started the 2013–14 season on the Oilers' NHL roster, and scored his first NHL goal on October 14, 2013, against Braden Holtby of the Washington Capitals. He would split the season between the Oilers, and AHL affiliate the Oklahoma City Barons.

In the 2014–15 season, Acton appeared in 3 games with the Oilers before on November 20, 2014, he was traded to the Vancouver Canucks, in exchange for center Kellan Lain. Acton was immediately assigned to the Canucks AHL affiliate, the Utica Comets for the remainder of the season.

As an un-signed free agent over the summer on September 28, 2015, Acton accepted a European offer in agreeing to a one-year deal with the German club, Schwenninger Wild Wings of the Deutsche Eishockey Liga (DEL). Acton led the Wild Wings in total points with 55 (16 goals, 39 assists) in 46 games, which ranked him third in the DEL regular season.

After captaining the Wild Wings in the 2017–18 season, Acton left after his contract to sign a three-year deal with fellow DEL club, the Thomas Sabo Ice Tigers, on April 26, 2018.

== Personal ==
Acton was born in Edina, Minnesota, but grew up in Whitchurch–Stouffville, Ontario. His father, Keith, was playing for the Minnesota North Stars at his time of birth.

His father also played hockey professionally with the Montreal Canadiens, Edmonton Oilers, Philadelphia Flyers, Washington Capitals and New York Islanders over a 17-year playing career, winning a Stanley Cup in 1988 as a member of the Oilers. Keith previously held the role of Associate Coach to Dallas Eakins, the former Oilers head coach and former head coach of the Toronto Marlies.

== Career statistics ==
Medal record

Ice hockey

Representing Canada East

World Junior A Challenge
Silver medal – second place	2006 Yorkton	

			Regular season					Playoffs
Season	Team	League	GP	G	A	Pts	PIM	GP	G	A	Pts	PIM
2003–04	Stouffville Spirit	OPJHL	1	1	0	1	0	—	—	—	—	—
2004–05	Stouffville Spirit	OPJHL	41	5	8	13	28	—	—	—	—	—
2005–06	Stouffville Spirit	OPJHL	48	11	20	31	38	—	—	—	—	—
2006–07	Stouffville Spirit	OPJHL	33	16	13	29	63	—	—	—	—	—
2007–08	Lake Superior State U.	CCHA	36	6	7	13	22	—	—	—	—	—
2008–09	Lake Superior State U.	CCHA	38	7	9	16	53	—	—	—	—	—
2009–10	Lake Superior State U.	CCHA	36	10	14	24	39	—	—	—	—	—
2010–11	Lake Superior State U.	CCHA	34	9	15	24	18	—	—	—	—	—
2010–11	Reading Royals	ECHL	1	0	0	0	0	—	—	—	—	—
2010–11	Toronto Marlies	AHL	5	0	0	0	0	—	—	—	—	—
2011–12	Toronto Marlies	AHL	69	7	9	16	58	17	1	1	2	9
2012–13	Toronto Marlies	AHL	67	8	11	19	60	9	4	2	6	12
2013–14	Edmonton Oilers	NHL	30	3	2	5	21	—	—	—	—	—
2013–14	Oklahoma City Barons	AHL	47	12	11	23	74	3	0	1	1	0
2014–15	Edmonton Oilers	NHL	3	0	0	0	5	—	—	—	—	—
2014–15	Oklahoma City Barons	AHL	6	1	1	2	2	—	—	—	—	—
2014–15	Utica Comets	AHL	45	11	8	19	26	9	1	2	3	2
2015–16	Schwenninger Wild Wings	DEL	46	16	39	55	67	—	—	—	—	—
2016–17	Schwenninger Wild Wings	DEL	52	16	28	44	55	—	—	—	—	—
2017–18	Schwenninger Wild Wings	DEL	51	18	30	48	30	2	2	0	2	0
2018–19	Thomas Sabo Ice Tigers	DEL	52	12	23	35	8	8	0	1	1	2
2019–20	Thomas Sabo Ice Tigers	DEL	52	9	24	33	36	—	—	—	—	—
NHL totals			33	3	2	5	26	—	—	—	—	—
