= Dan Sexton =

American ice hockey player (born 1987)

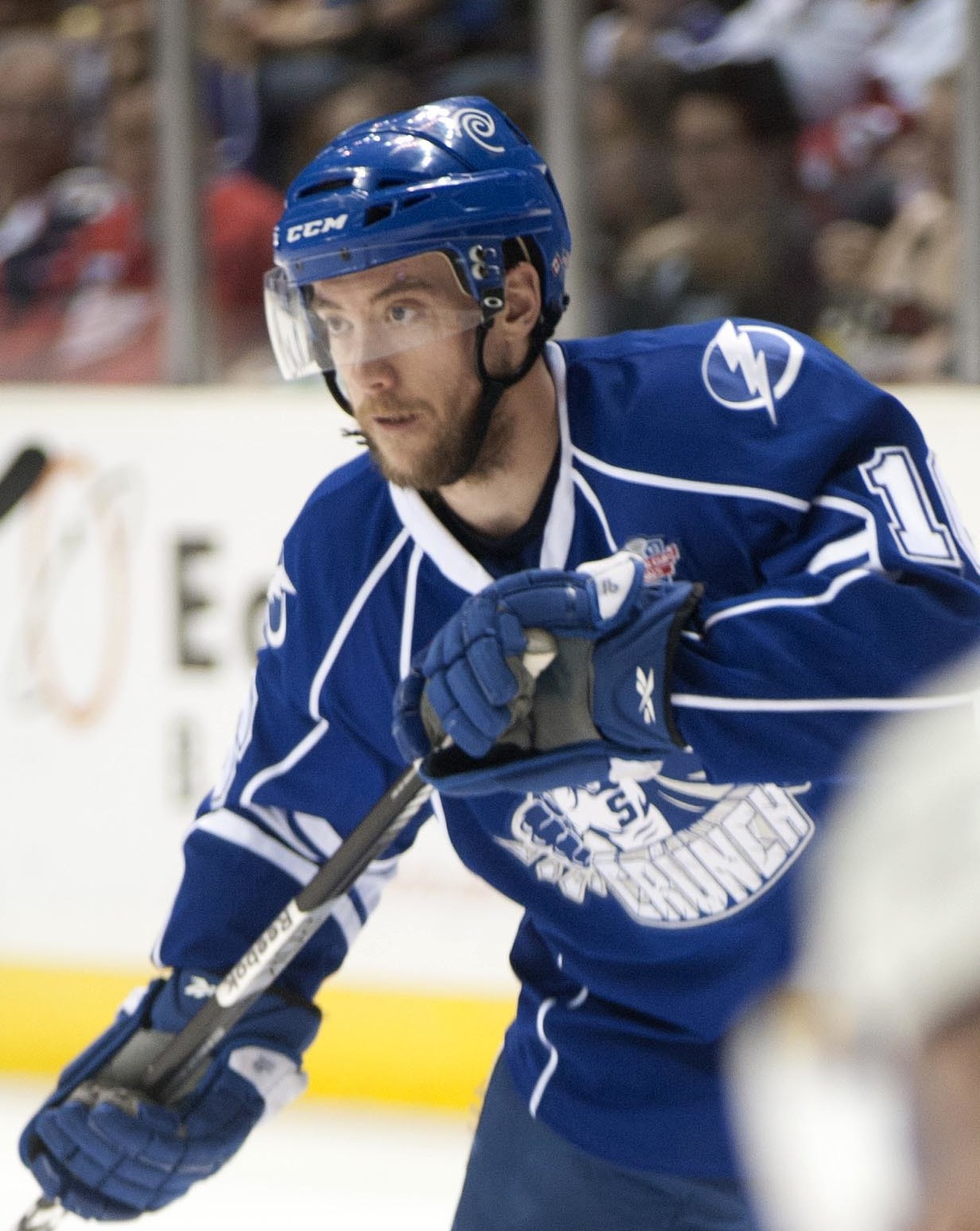
- Sexton with the Syracuse Crunch in 2013
- Born: April 29, 1987 (age 39) Apple Valley, Minnesota, U.S.
- Height: 5 ft 10 in (178 cm)
- Weight: 170 lb (77 kg; 12 st 2 lb)
- Position: Right wing
- Shot: Right
- Played for: Anaheim Ducks; TPS; Neftekhimik Nizhnekamsk; Avtomobilist Yekaterinburg; Växjö Lakers
- National team: United States
- NHL draft: Undrafted
- Playing career: 2009–2023

Dan Sexton (born April 29, 1987) is an American former professional ice hockey winger. He played in the National Hockey League (NHL) with the Anaheim Ducks.

== Playing career ==
Dan Sexton played for Bowling Green State University from 2007–2009, playing 76 games and recording 24 goals and 60 points in his NCAA career.

Sexton, an undrafted free agent, left college when he was signed by the Anaheim Ducks on April 7, 2009. After beginning the 2009–10 season in the minors with the Bakersfield Condors in the ECHL, he was called up to the Ducks and played his first NHL game against the Minnesota Wild on December 4, 2009. Sexton recorded his first two NHL goals in his third NHL game on December 8, 2009, in a 4-3 win against the Dallas Stars at the Honda Center.

On July 11, 2011, Sexton re-signed a two-year, two-way contract with the Anaheim Ducks. During the 2012–13 season, on March 11, 2013, Sexton was traded by the Ducks to the Tampa Bay Lightning in exchange for Kyle Wilson.

Having initially moved abroad as a free agent in signing with Finnish club, HC TPS of the Liiga, Sexton left mid-season and played in the KHL for the following 5 seasons with HC Neftekhimik Nizhnekamsk. In the 2017–18 season, Sexton led Neftekhimik in scoring and finished 7th in league scoring with 47 points in 52 games.

Prior to the 2018–19 season, Sexton left Nizhnekamsk as a free agent, and signed a contract with Avtomobilist Yekaterinburg on May 2, 2018.

Sexton played three seasons with Avtomobilist, before leaving the club as a free agent and securing one-year contract in a return to former club, Neftekhimik Nizhnekamsk, for the 2021–22 season on May 17, 2021. In his second stint with Neftekhimik, Sexton posted 7 goals and 24 points through 46 games. He initially participated in the postseason, despite the abrupt exit of many foreign players and two non-Russia based KHL teams (Dinamo Riga and Jokerit Helsinki) due to the 2022 Russian invasion of Ukraine, before leaving the club after two games on March 4, 2022.

On July 27, 2022, as a free agent Sexton signed an optional two-year contract with Swedish club, Växjö Lakers of the Swedish Hockey League (SHL). In the 2022–23 season, Sexton played in a top nine forward role, adding a veteran presence in collecting 24 points through the regular season. He upon adding 8 points in 13 playoff games to help Växjö win their fourth Le Mat Trophy, he announced his retirement from professional hockey on May 18, 2023.

== Career statistics ==
=== Regular season and playoffs ===
| | | | Regular season | | | | | Playoffs |
| Season | Team | League | GP | G | A | Pts | PIM | GP | G | A | Pts | PIM |
|---|---|---|---|---|---|---|---|---|---|---|---|---|
| 2005–06 | Wichita Falls Wildcats | NAHL | 58 | 22 | 37 | 59 | 16 | — | — | — | — | — |
| 2006–07 | Sioux Falls Stampede | USHL | 58 | 14 | 10 | 24 | 20 | 8 | 8 | 1 | 9 | 0 |
| 2007–08 | Bowling Green State University | CCHA | 38 | 7 | 14 | 21 | 42 | — | — | — | — | — |
| 2008–09 | Bowling Green State University | CCHA | 38 | 17 | 22 | 39 | 20 | — | — | — | — | — |
| 2009–10 | Bakersfield Condors | ECHL | 18 | 13 | 13 | 26 | 14 | — | — | — | — | — |
| 2009–10 | Manitoba Moose | AHL | 13 | 5 | 7 | 12 | 2 | 6 | 2 | 3 | 5 | 2 |
| 2009–10 | Anaheim Ducks | NHL | 41 | 9 | 10 | 19 | 16 | — | — | — | — | — |
| 2010–11 | Anaheim Ducks | NHL | 47 | 4 | 9 | 13 | 4 | 1 | 0 | 0 | 0 | 2 |
| 2010–11 | Syracuse Crunch | AHL | 17 | 9 | 8 | 17 | 4 | — | — | — | — | — |
| 2011–12 | Syracuse Crunch | AHL | 71 | 13 | 30 | 43 | 22 | 4 | 1 | 2 | 3 | 0 |
| 2012–13 | Norfolk Admirals | AHL | 27 | 5 | 11 | 16 | 6 | — | — | — | — | — |
| 2012–13 | Syracuse Crunch | AHL | 16 | 4 | 8 | 12 | 8 | 18 | 6 | 6 | 12 | 6 |
| 2013–14 | TPS | Liiga | 39 | 16 | 21 | 37 | 16 | — | — | — | — | — |
| 2013–14 | Neftekhimik Nizhnekamsk | KHL | 10 | 2 | 2 | 4 | 2 | — | — | — | — | — |
| 2014–15 | Neftekhimik Nizhnekamsk | KHL | 49 | 19 | 28 | 47 | 12 | — | — | — | — | — |
| 2015–16 | Neftekhimik Nizhnekamsk | KHL | 33 | 7 | 15 | 22 | 2 | 4 | 0 | 0 | 0 | 0 |
| 2016–17 | Neftekhimik Nizhnekamsk | KHL | 51 | 13 | 37 | 50 | 16 | — | — | — | — | — |
| 2017–18 | Neftekhimik Nizhnekamsk | KHL | 52 | 12 | 35 | 47 | 43 | 2 | 0 | 0 | 0 | 0 |
| 2018–19 | Avtomobilist Yekaterinburg | KHL | 61 | 25 | 28 | 53 | 6 | 9 | 2 | 6 | 8 | 2 |
| 2019–20 | Avtomobilist Yekaterinburg | KHL | 55 | 15 | 19 | 34 | 8 | 5 | 1 | 1 | 2 | 8 |
| 2020–21 | Avtomobilist Yekaterinburg | KHL | 41 | 7 | 18 | 25 | 10 | — | — | — | — | — |
| 2021–22 | Neftekhimik Nizhnekamsk | KHL | 46 | 7 | 17 | 24 | 10 | 2 | 0 | 1 | 1 | 0 |
| 2022–23 | Växjö Lakers | SHL | 44 | 8 | 16 | 24 | 10 | 13 | 3 | 5 | 8 | 2 |
| NHL totals | | | 88 | 13 | 19 | 32 | 20 | 1 | 0 | 0 | 0 | 2 |
| KHL totals | | | 398 | 107 | 199 | 306 | 109 | 22 | 3 | 8 | 11 | 10 |

Medal record

Representing United States

Ice hockey

World Championships
| Bronze medal – third place | 2015 Czech Republic | |

=== International ===
| Year | Team | Event | Result | GP | G | A | Pts | PIM |
|---|---|---|---|---|---|---|---|---|
| 2015 | United States | WC | 3rd place, bronze medalist(s) | 7 | 1 | 1 | 2 | 0 |
| Senior totals | | | | 7 | 1 | 1 | 2 | 0 |

== Awards and honors ==
| Award | Year |
|---|---|
USHL
| Clark Cup (with the Sioux Falls Stampede) | 2007 |
KHL
| All-Star Game | 2017, 2018 |
