= C. J. Stretch =

American ice hockey player (born 1989)

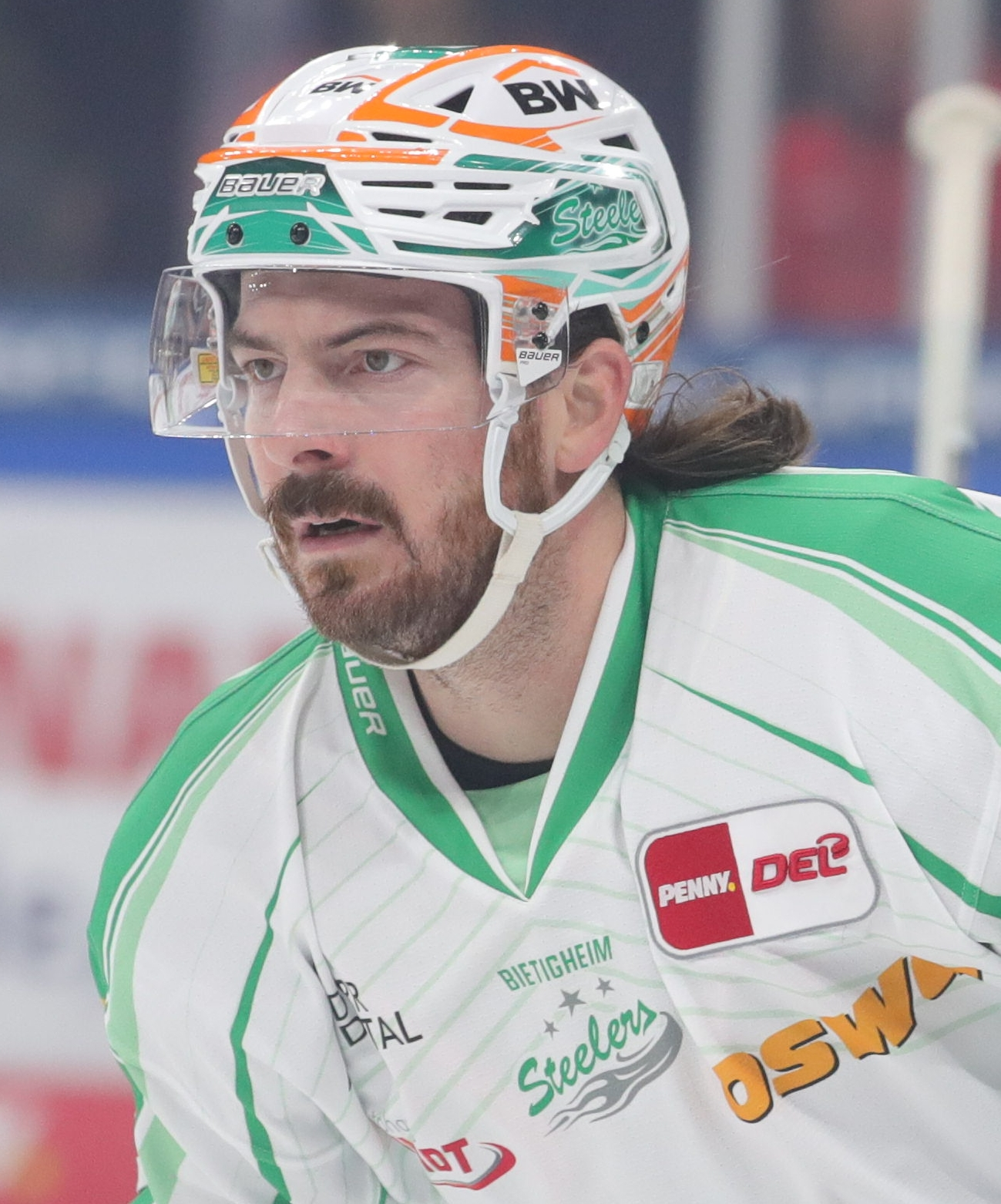
- Stretch with the Bietigheim Steelers in 2022
- Born: August 3, 1989 (age 36) Irvine, California, U.S.
- Height: 6 ft 0 in (183 cm)
- Weight: 195 lb (88 kg; 13 st 13 lb)
- Position: Center
- Shoots: Right
- DEL2 team Former teams: Starbulls Rosenheim; Houston Aeros; Bridgeport Sound Tigers; Oklahoma City Barons; Löwen Frankfurt; Orli Znojmo; MAC Budapest; Bietigheim Steelers
- NHL draft: Undrafted
- Playing career: 2009–present

Charles G. Stretch (born August 3, 1989) is an American professional ice hockey player who currently plays for Starbulls Rosenheim of the DEL2 in Germany.

== Playing career ==
Undrafted, Stretch played major junior hockey with the Kamloops Blazers in the Western Hockey League. He made his professional debut at the tail end of the 2009–10 season, with the Ontario Reign in the ECHL where he was a fan favorite.

On January 24, 2013, Stretch was a starter for the 2012–13 ECHL All-Star Game and played as the elected captain of the All-Star team.

On September 19, 2014, it was announced Stretch would attend the Bridgeport Sound Tigers training camp after signing a one-year AHL contract. In the 2014–15 season, Stretch continued his scoring pace with 26 points in 47 games before he was traded in a return to the Oklahoma City Barons on February 25, 2015.

On August 7, 2015, Stretch opted to pursue a career abroad, agreeing to a one-year contract in the German second tier DEL2 with Starbulls Rosenheim.
