= 2013–14 Grand Rapids Griffins season =

Ice hockey league season

2013–14 Grand Rapids Griffins
- Division: 2nd Midwest Division
- Conference: 1st Western Conference
- 2013–14 record: 46–23–2–5
- Home record: 21–12–0–2
- Road record: 23–10–2–3
- Goals for: 238
- Goals against: 187

Team information
- General manager: Dan DeVos
- Coach: Jeff Blashill
- Assistant coach: Jim Paek; Spiros Anastas
- Captain: Jeff Hoggan
- Alternate captains: Brennan Evans; Nathan Paetsch
- Arena: Van Andel Arena
- Average attendance: 8,220 (75.9%); Total: 312,355

Team leaders
- Goals: Teemu Pulkkinen (31)
- Assists: Adam Almqvist (49)
- Points: Teemu Pulkkinen (59)
- Penalty minutes: Brennan Evans (111)
- Plus/minus: (+) Mitch Callahan (+23) (−) Martin Frk (−12)
- Wins: Tom McCollum (24)
- Goals against average: Petr Mrázek (2.10)

The 2013–14 Grand Rapids Griffins season was the franchise's 13th season in the American Hockey League.

== Off-season ==
Following the Grand Rapids Griffins' Calder Cup-winning season last year, several of the players were called up to the Detroit Red Wings, including forwards Joakim Andersson and Tomáš Tatar; and defensemen Danny DeKeyser, Brian Lashoff and Brendan Smith. There was a great deal of roster movements between the two teams throughout the off-season, with some players getting repeatedly called back and forth, which meant Griffins coach Jeff Blashill could not finalize the roster or power play and penalty kill teams until just before the regular season began. Ten of the 20 players on Detroit's starting roster had played with Grand Rapids the previous year. Other Griffins departures included defenseman Chad Billins, goaltender Jordan Pearce, and forwards Jan Muršak, and Francis Paré. Winger Cory Emmerton began the regular season with Detroit after Patrick Eaves was placed on long-term injured reserve.

Gustav Nyquist was sent down to Grand Rapids from Detroit, but was not expected to remain there long. The move was primarily intended to keep the team under its salary cap, since Nyquist could be transferred without having to clear waivers. The Griffins signed several new skaters during the off-season, giving the roster a mix of veterans and young prospects. New additions included goaltender Jared Coreau; defensemen Alexey Marchenko, Richard Nedomlel and Xavier Ouellet; forwards Martin Frk, David McIntyre and Marek Tvrdon. McIntyre was the only one of the seven with previous American Hockey League experience. The team re-signed defensemen Nathan Paetsch and Brennan Evans, and forwards Triston Grant and team captain Jeff Hoggan, as well as several skaters who had played only a handful of games the previous year, including center Calle Järnkrok, winger Teemu Pulkkinen, and defenseman Ryan Sproul.

After a training camp that began September 23 at Van Andel Arena, the Griffins played a pair of off-season games against the Lake Erie Monsters, although eight of their players were absent due to a call-up to Detroit. Grand Rapids won the first game 3–2 in a shootout, with Frk scoring the sole shootout goal and McCollum making 36 saves and stopped five shootout shots. Lake Erie won the second game in a 2–0 shutout. Center Landon Ferraro, the team's third-highest score the previous year, suffered a foot injury during the off-season that kept him out of the first two weeks of the regular season.

== Regular season ==
On October 4, the Grand Rapids Griffins won their season opener against the Rochester Americans by a score of 8–1, setting a franchise record for largest margin of victory in a season debut, breaking the previous record of four goals in 2004. Gustav Nyquist and Adam Almquist led the scoring with three points apiece.

== Schedule and results ==
=== Pre-season ===
2013–14 Pre-season Game Log: 1–1–0–0

#	Date	Visitor	Score	Home	OT	Decision	Record
1	September 28^{1}	Lake Erie	2–3	Grand Rapids	SO	McCollum	1–0–0–0
2	September 29^{2}	Grand Rapids	0–2	Lake Erie		Coreau	1–1–0–0
Game played at Compuware Arena in Plymouth Township, Michigan; Game played at WFCU Centre in Windsor, Ontario

=== Regular season ===
2013–14 Regular season Game Log

October: 5–2–1–1 (Home: 1–2–0–0; Road: 4–0–1–1)
#	Date	Visitor	Score	Home	OT	Decision	Attendance	Record	Pts	Gamesheet
1	October 4	Grand Rapids	8–1	Rochester		McCollum	6,500	1–0–0–0	2	Gamesheet
2	October 5	Grand Rapids	3–4	Toronto	OT	Coreau	6,525	1–0–1–0	3	Gamesheet
3	October 12	Grand Rapids	4–3	Hamilton	SO	Mrazek	3,416	2–0–1–0	5	Gamesheet
4	October 18	Milwaukee	3–2	Grand Rapids		Mrazek	10,834	2–1–1–0	5	Gamesheet
5	October 19	Grand Rapids	5–4	Rockford	SO	Mrazek	6,202	2–1–1–1	6	Gamesheet
6	October 25	Charlotte	5–0	Grand Rapids		Mrazek	5,494	2–2–1–1	6	Gamesheet
7	October 26	Grand Rapids	3–2	Chicago		McCollum	4,484	3–2–1–1	8	Gamesheet
8	October 27	Grand Rapids	3–2	Iowa		McCollum	3,825	4–2–1–1	10	Gamesheet
9	October 30	Charlotte	2–5	Grand Rapids		Mrazek	2,974	5–2–1–1	12	Gamesheet

November: 10–2–0–0 (Home: 5–0–0–0; Road: 5–2–0–0)
#	Date	Visitor	Score	Home	OT	Decision	Attendance	Record	Pts	Gamesheet
10	November 1	Grand Rapids	6–4	Lake Erie		McCollum	7,044	6–2–1–1	14	Gamesheet
11	November 3	Grand Rapids	3–1	Rockford		McCollum	3,033	7–2–1–1	16	Gamesheet
12	November 6	Rockford	2–6	Grand Rapids		McCollum	6,118	8–2–1–1	18	Gamesheet
13	November 8	Grand Rapids	6–1	Hamilton		Mrazek	3,088	9–2–1–1	20	Gamesheet
14	November 13	Grand Rapids	1–2	Milwaukee		McCollum	2,659	9–3–1–1	20	Gamesheet
15	November 15	Rockford	3–5	Grand Rapids		Mrazek	9,260	10–3–1–1	22	Gamesheet
16	November 16	Grand Rapids	3–4	Chicago		McCollum	9,226	10–4–1–1	22	Gamesheet
17	November 20	Milwaukee	0–5	Grand Rapids		Mrazek	5,056	11–4–1–1	24	Gamesheet
18	November 22	Grand Rapids	2–1	Iowa		Mrazek	7,580	12–4–1–1	26	Gamesheet
19	November 23	Grand Rapids	2–1	Chicago		Mrazek	7,228	13–4–1–1	28	Gamesheet
20	November 29	Texas	4–5	Grand Rapids		Mrazek	8,288	14–4–1–1	30	Gamesheet
21	November 30	Texas	1–5	Grand Rapids		McCollum	5,749	15–4–1–1	32	Gamesheet

December: 7–4–0–1 (Home: 5–2–0–1; Road: 2–2–0–0)
#	Date	Visitor	Score	Home	OT	Decision	Attendance	Record	Pts	Gamesheet
22	December 6	Rochester	1–5	Grand Rapids		Mrazek	6,901	16–4–1–1	34	Gamesheet
23	December 7	Rochester	1–3	Grand Rapids		Mrazek	5,115	17–4–1–1	36	Gamesheet
24	December 11	Chicago	4–2	Grand Rapids		McCollum	6,290	17–5–1–1	36	Gamesheet
25	December 13	Milwaukee	2–4	Grand Rapids		McCollum	5,976	18–5–1–1	38	Gamesheet
26	December 14	Milwaukee	0–5	Grand Rapids		McCollum	8,002	19–5–1–1	40	Gamesheet
27	December 18	Grand Rapids	2–1	Iowa	OT	McCollum	3,619	20–5–1–1	42	Gamesheet
28	December 20	Rockford	2–3	Grand Rapids	OT	McCollum	8,269	21–5–1–1	44	Gamesheet
29	December 21	Grand Rapids	2–3	Chicago		McCollum	5,724	21–6–1–1	44	Gamesheet
30	December 26	Grand Rapids	1–4	Milwaukee		McCollum	5,197	21–7–1–1	44	Gamesheet
31	December 27	Grand Rapids	4–2	Rockford		McCollum	4,105	22–7–1–1	46	Gamesheet
32	December 30^{1}	Toronto	4–2	Grand Rapids	SO	McCollum	20,337	22–7–1–2	47	Gamesheet
33	December 31	Toronto	3–1	Grand Rapids		McCollum	10,834	22–8–1–2	47	Gamesheet
Game played at Comerica Park in Detroit, Michigan

January: 6–5–1–0 (Home: 5–3–0–0; Road: 1–2–1–0)
#	Date	Visitor	Score	Home	OT	Decision	Attendance	Record	Pts	Gamesheet
34	January 3	Chicago	1–3	Grand Rapids		McCollum	6,963	23–8–1–2	49	Gamesheet
35	January 4	Grand Rapids	2–4	Rockford		Coreau	4,145	23–9–1–2	49	Gamesheet
36	January 8	Rockford	2–4	Grand Rapids		McCollum	3,672	24–9–1–2	51	Gamesheet
37	January 10	Iowa	3–2	Grand Rapids		McCollum	7,285	24–10–1–2	51	Gamesheet
38	January 11	Iowa	1–4	Grand Rapids		McCollum	9,360	25–10–1–2	53	Gamesheet
39	January 15	Chicago	1–3	Grand Rapids		McCollum	5,493	26–10–1–2	55	Gamesheet
40	January 17	Abbotsford	0–3	Grand Rapids		McCollum	8,098	27–10–1–2	57	Gamesheet
41	January 18	Abbotsford	3–2	Grand Rapids		McCollum	9,170	27–11–1–2	57	Gamesheet
42	January 24	Grand Rapids	4–6	Texas		Coreau	4,639	27–12–1–2	57	Gamesheet
43	January 25	Grand Rapids	4–1	Texas		McCollum	6,863	28–12–1–2	59	Gamesheet
44	January 26	Grand Rapids	5–6	San Antonio	OT	Coreau	4,995	28–12–2–2	60	Gamesheet
45	January 31	Chicago	6–2	Grand Rapids		McCollum	10,834	28–13–2–2	60	Gamesheet

February: 6–4–0–1 (Home: 2–3–0–1; Road: 4–1–0–0)
#	Date	Visitor	Score	Home	OT	Decision	Attendance	Record	Pts	Gamesheet
46	February 1	Grand Rapids	3–2	Milwaukee	SO	Mrazek	7,621	29–13–2–2	62	Gamesheet
47	February 5	Lake Erie	4–0	Grand Rapids		Mrazek	6,346	29–14–2–2	62	Gamesheet
48	February 7	Grand Rapids	1–4	Toronto		Mrazek	5,237	29–15–2–2	62	Gamesheet
49	February 8	Grand Rapids	5–1	Rochester		McCollum	17,968	30–15–2–2	64	Gamesheet
50	February 14	San Antonio	2–1	Grand Rapids	SO	McCollum	6,724	30–15–2–3	65	Gamesheet
51	February 15	San Antonio	3–0	Grand Rapids		Mrazek	10,018	30–16–2–3	65	Gamesheet
52	February 21	Oklahoma City	4–2	Grand Rapids		McCollum	10,834	30–17–2–3	65	Gamesheet
53	February 22	Oklahoma City	3–4	Grand Rapids		Mrazek	8,254	31–17–2–3	67	Gamesheet
54	February 23	Milwaukee	0–1	Grand Rapids	SO	Mrazek	8,451	32–17–2–3	69	Gamesheet
55	February 26	Grand Rapids	5–1	Milwaukee		Mrazek	3,002	33–17–2–3	71	Gamesheet
56	February 28	Grand Rapids	4–3	Abbotsford	SO	Mrazek	3,068	34–17–2–3	73	Gamesheet

March: 9–3–0–1 (Home: 3–1–0–0; Road: 6–2–0–1)
#	Date	Visitor	Score	Home	OT	Decision	Attendance	Record	Pts	Gamesheet
57	March 1	Grand Rapids	5–2	Abbotsford		Mrazek	2,774	35–17–2–3	75	Gamesheet
58	March 5	Chicago	2–4	Grand Rapids		Mrazek	5,343	36–17–2–3	77	Gamesheet
59	March 7	Iowa	0–4	Grand Rapids		Mrazek	8,594	37–17–2–3	79	Gamesheet
60	March 8	Iowa	3–1	Grand Rapids		McCollum	10,834	37–18–2–3	79	Gamesheet
61	March 13	Grand Rapids	1–2	San Antonio	SO	McCollum	6,772	37–18–2–4	80	Gamesheet
62	March 14	Grand Rapids	3–2	Oklahoma City		McCollum	3,294	38–18–2–4	82	Gamesheet
63	March 15	Grand Rapids	4–3	Oklahoma City		McCollum	4,494	39–18–2–4	84	Gamesheet
64	March 21	Grand Rapids	4–1	Iowa		McCollum	6,547	40–18–2–4	86	Gamesheet
65	March 22	Grand Rapids	3–2	Iowa		Mrazek	6,359	41–18–2–4	88	Gamesheet
66	March 23	Grand Rapids	2–6	Chicago		Mrazek	11,388	41–19–2–4	88	Gamesheet
67	March 28	Grand Rapids	4–5	Rockford		McCollum	5,223	41–20–2–4	88	Gamesheet
68	March 29	Rockford	1–4	Grand Rapids		Mrazek	10,834	42–20–2–4	90	Gamesheet
69	March 30	Grand Rapids	3–1	Milwaukee		Mrazek	8,090	43–20–2–4	92	Gamesheet

April: 3–3–0–1 (Home: 2–2–0–0; Road: 1–1–0–1)
#	Date	Visitor	Score	Home	OT	Decision	Attendance	Record	Pts	Gamesheet
70	April 2	Iowa	1–6	Grand Rapids		Mrazek	8,077	44–20–2–4	94	Gamesheet
71	April 4	Hamilton	4–1	Grand Rapids		Mrazek	10,834	44–21–2–4	94	Gamesheet
72	April 5	Hamilton	1–2	Grand Rapids	SO	McCollum	10,006	45–21–2–4	96	Gamesheet
73	April 10	Grand Rapids	0–3	Charlotte		Mrazek	6,709	45–22–2–4	96	Gamesheet
74	April 13	Grand Rapids	2–1	Charlotte		McCollum	8,002	46–22–2–4	98	Gamesheet
75	April 18	Lake Erie	4–2	Grand Rapids		Mrazek	10,834	46–23–2–4	98	Gamesheet
76	April 19	Grand Rapids	3–4	Lake Erie	SO	McCollum	14,064	46–22–2–5	99	Gamesheet

Legend: Win (2 points) Loss (0 points) Overtime/shootout loss (1-point)

== Playoffs ==
2014 Calder Cup Playoffs

Western Conference Quarterfinals vs. (5) Abbotsford Heat – Grand Rapids won series 3–1
#	Date	Visitor	Score	Home	OT	Decision	Attendance	Series	Recap
1	April 25	Grand Rapids	2–1	Abbotsford	2 OT	Mrazek	2,420	1–0	Recap
2	April 26	Grand Rapids	7–2	Abbotsford		Mrazek	2,154	2–0	Recap
3	April 30	Abbotsford	2–1	Grand Rapids		Mrazek	7,193	2–1	Recap
4	May 2	Abbotsford	3–5	Grand Rapids		Mrazek	7,641	3–1	Recap

Western Conference Semifinals vs. (1) Texas Stars – Texas won series 4–2
#	Date	Visitor	Score	Home	OT	Decision	Attendance	Series	Recap
1	May 8	Grand Rapids	2–5	Texas		Mrazek	2,661	0–1	Recap
2	May 10	Grand Rapids	0–4	Texas		Mrazek	4,635	0–2	Recap
3	May 13	Texas	2–5	Grand Rapids		Mrazek	4,293	1–2	Recap
4	May 14	Texas	2–3	Grand Rapids		Mrazek	5,089	2–2	Recap
5	May 16	Texas	3–2	Grand Rapids	OT	Mrazek	8,057	2–3	Recap
6	May 18	Grand Rapids	1–7	Texas		Mrazek	4,010	2–4	Recap

Legend: Win Loss

== Player statistics ==
=== Skaters ===
Note: GP = Games played; G = Goals; A = Assists; Pts = Points; +/− = Plus/minus; PIM = Penalty minutes

Regular season
Player	GP	G	A	Pts	+/-	PIM
Teemu Pulkkinen^{*}	71	31	28	59	18	34
Adam Almquist	73	4	49	53	9	56
Cory Emmerton	53	16	30	46	17	14
Mitch Callahan	70	26	18	44	23	51
Andrej Nestrasil	70	16	20	36	0	24
Calle Jarnkrok^{‡}	57	13	23	36	19	14
Tomas Jurco^{‡}	32	13	19	32	10	14
Ryan Sproul^{*}	72	11	21	32	0	49
Landon Ferraro	70	15	16	31	−3	52
Jeff Hoggan	59	14	17	31	1	31
Nathan Paetsch	68	4	27	31	18	40
David McIntyre	64	8	13	21	−1	45
Gustav Nyquist^{‡}	15	7	14	21	6	6
Riley Sheahan^{‡}	31	8	10	18	−2	12
Jordin Tootoo	51	6	12	18	−1	104
Alexey Marchenko^{*}	49	3	15	18	11	14
Brennan Evans	68	4	13	17	14	111
Xavier Ouellet	70	4	13	17	3	22
Triston Grant	51	6	10	16	6	103
Luke Glendening^{‡}	18	5	7	12	8	18
Martin Frk	50	3	9	12	−12	22
Trevor Parkes	36	6	3	9	5	27
Nick Jensen	45	0	9	9	12	8
Patrick Eaves^{‡}	8	4	2	6	1	8
Louis-Marc Aubry	38	2	2	4	−1	16
Andreas Athanasiou	2	1	2	3	0	0
Travis Novak^{‡}	9	1	2	3	3	6
Alden Hirschfeld	13	1	1	2	3	7
Gleason Fournier	25	0	2	2	4	4
Colin Campbell	13	1	0	1	−2	5
Marek Tvrdon^{‡}	1	0	0	0	0	0
Mattias Backman	2	0	0	0	−1	0
Darren Helm^{‡}	2	0	0	0	0	0
Mattias Janmark-Nylen	2	0	0	0	1	2
Mikael Samuelsson^{‡}	2	0	0	0	−4	0
Richard Nedomlel	3	0	0	0	−2	2
Zach Nastasiuk	5	0	0	0	−2	0

Playoffs
Player	GP	G	A	Pts	+/-	PIM
Teemu Pulkkinen	10	5	6	11	8	10
Cory Emmerton	10	2	7	9	4	2
Tomas Jurco	8	5	2	7	−5	11
Andrej Nestrasil	10	4	2	6	4	4
Mattias Backman	10	1	5	6	−6	2
Jeff Hoggan	10	4	1	5	−4	12
Ryan Sproul	10	2	3	5	2	4
Mitch Callahan	8	1	4	5	−5	6
Riley Sheahan	8	1	4	5	−5	0
Nathan Paetsch	10	0	5	5	2	4
Landon Ferraro	9	1	2	3	−4	2
David McIntyre	10	1	1	2	0	9
Trevor Parkes	3	1	0	1	2	12
Gleason Fournier	1	0	1	1	2	2
Jordin Tootoo	4	0	1	1	−3	4
Andreas Athanasiou	6	0	1	1	2	6
Mattias Janmark-Nylen	6	0	1	1	−1	0
Zach Nastasiuk	6	0	1	1	−1	0
Nick Jensen	10	0	1	1	−3	2
Adam Almquist	1	0	0	0	0	0
Colin Campbell	3	0	0	0	1	2
Martin Frk	4	0	0	0	−4	0
Triston Grant	4	0	0	0	0	4
Xavier Ouellet	8	0	0	0	−5	4
Brennan Evans	10	0	0	0	2	30

=== Goaltenders ===
Note: GP = Games played; TOI = Time on ice; W = Wins; L = Losses; GA = Goals against; GAA = Goals against average; SV = Saves; SA = Shots against; SV% = Save percentage; SO = Shutouts; G = Goals; A = Assists; PIM = Penalty minutes

Regular season
Player	GP	TOI	W	L	GA	GAA	SV	SA	SV%	SO	G	A	PIM
Petr Mrazek	32	1829:52	22	9	64	2.10	774	838	.924	3	0	2	2
Tom McCollum	46	2560:46	24	12	98	2.30	1158	1256	.922	2	0	0	6
Jared Coreau	5	205:06	0	4	15	4.39	103	118	.873	0	0	1	0
Totals		4622:56	46	25	182	2.36	2035	2217	.918	5	0	3	8

Playoffs
Player	GP	TOI	W	L	GA	GAA	SV	SA	SV%	SO	G	A	PIM
Petr Mrazek	10	599:32	5	5	28	2.80	288	316	.911	0	0	0	0
Tom McCollum	1	28:01	0	0	2	4.28	14	16	.875	0	0	0	0
Totals		632:49	5	5	31	2.94	302	333	.907	0	0	0	0

^{†}Denotes player spent time with another team before joining team. Stats reflect time with the team only.
^{‡}Left the team mid-season
^{*}Rookie

== Final roster ==
Updated April 19, 2014

No.	Nat	Player	Pos	S/G	Age	Acquired	Birthplace	Contract
5	(Sweden)	Adam Almqvist	D	L	23	2012	Jönköping, Sweden	Red Wings
47	(Canada)	Andreas Athanasiou	LW	L	19	2012	Woodbridge, Ontario	Red Wings
22	(Canada)	Louis-Marc Aubry	C	L	22	2010	Arthabaska, Quebec	Red Wings
46	(Sweden)	Mattias Backman	D	L	21	2013	Linköping, Sweden	Red Wings
15	(United States)	Mitch Callahan	RW	R	22	2011	Whittier, California	Red Wings
32	(Canada)	Colin Campbell	F	R	23	2013	Pickering, Ontario	Red Wings
8	(South Africa)	Willie Coetzee	RW	R	23	2009	Johannesburg, South Africa	Red Wings
31	(Canada)	Jared Coreau	G	L	22	2013	Perth, Ontario	Red Wings
44	(Canada)	Brennan Evans (A)	D	L	32	2012	North Battleford, Saskatchewan	Griffins
18	(Canada)	Cory Emmerton	C	L	25	2006	St. Thomas, Ontario	Red Wings
29	(Canada)	Landon Ferraro	C	R	22	2010	Trail, British Columbia	Red Wings
27	(Czech Republic)	Martin Frk	RW	R	20	2012	Pelhřimov, Czech Republic	Red Wings
20	(Canada)	Gleason Fournier	D	L	22	2011	Saint-Fabien, Quebec	Red Wings
23	(Canada)	Triston Grant	LW	L	30	2010	Neepawa, Manitoba	Griffins
10	(Canada)	Jeff Hoggan (C)	LW	L	36	2011	Hope, British Columbia	Griffins
38	(Sweden)	Mattias Janmark-Nylen	C	L	21	2013	Stockholm, Sweden	Griffins
14	(United States)	Nick Jensen	D	R	23	2009	Rogers, Minnesota	Red Wings
3	(Russia)	Alexey Marchenko	D	R	22	2011	Moscow, Russia	Red Wings
30	(United States)	Tom McCollum	G	L	24	2009	Cambria, New York	Red Wings
26	(Canada)	David McIntyre	C	L	27	2013	Pefferlaw, Ontario	Griffins
34	(Czech Republic)	Petr Mrazek	G	L	22	2012	Ostrava, Czechoslovakia	Red Wings
37	(Canada)	Zach Nastasiuk	RW	R	19	2013	Barrie, Ontario	Red Wings
42	(Czech Republic)	Richard Nedomlel	D	L	20	2011	Prague, Czech Republic	Red Wings
11	(Czech Republic)	Andrej Nestrasil	RW	L	23	2011	Prague, Czechoslovakia	Red Wings
17	(United States)	Max Nicastro	D	R	24	2012	Thousand Oaks, California	Red Wings
16	(France)	Xavier Ouellet	D	L	20	2011	Bayonne, France	Red Wings
4	(Canada)	Nathan Paetsch (A)	D	L	31	2012	LeRoy, Saskatchewan	Griffins
21	(Canada)	Trevor Parkes	LW	R	22	2011	Fort Erie, Ontario	Red Wings
1	(Canada)	Jake Paterson	G	L	19	2013	Mississauga, Ontario	Red Wings
6	(Finland)	Teemu Pulkkinen	RW	R	22	2013	Vantaa, Finland	Red Wings
7	(Canada)	Ryan Sproul	D	R	21	2011	Toronto, Ontario	Red Wings
22	(Canada)	Jordin Tootoo	RW	R	30	2012	Churchill, Manitoba	Red Wings
