= Brennan Evans =

Canadian ice hockey player

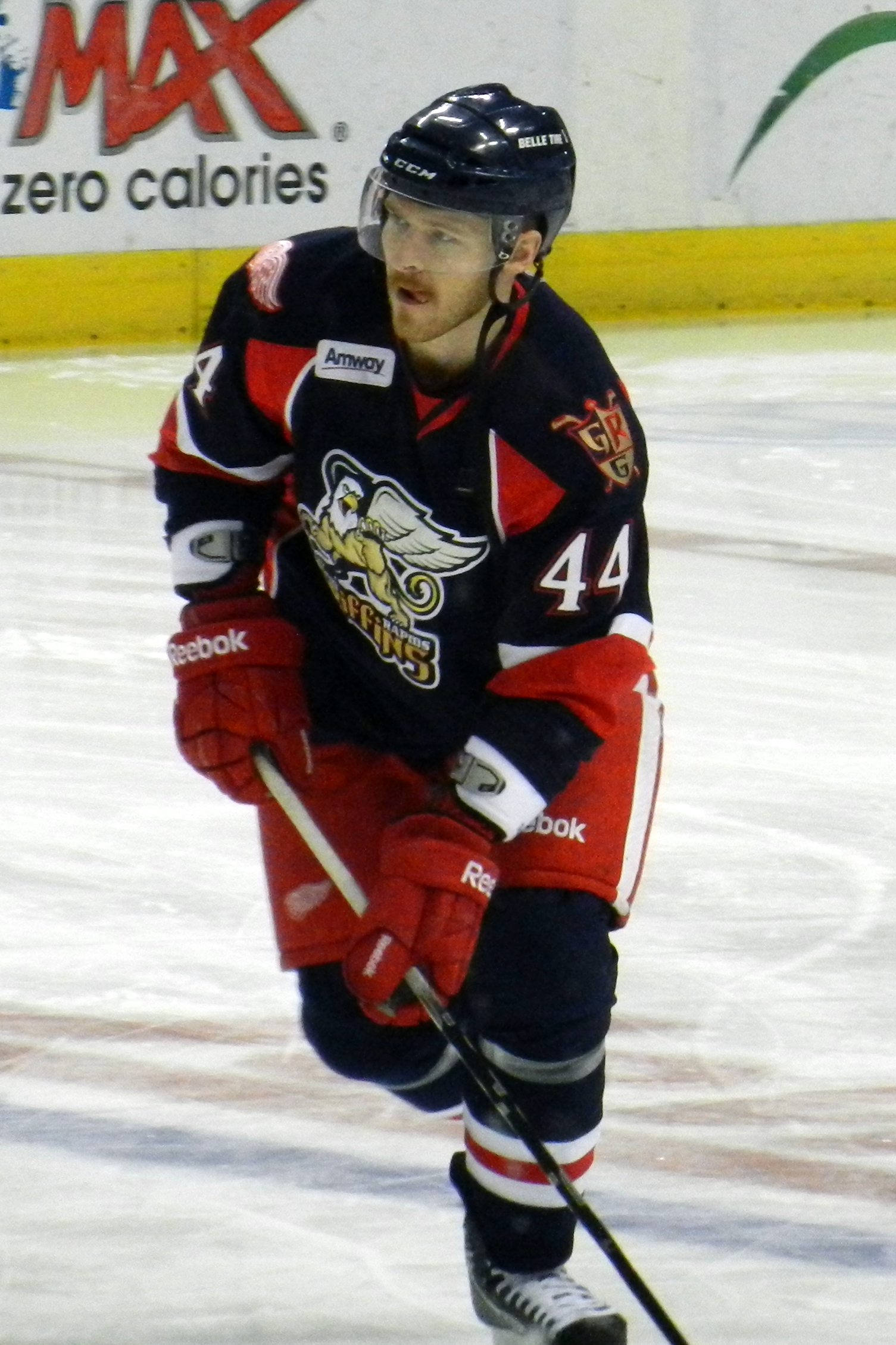
- Born: January 6, 1982 (age 44) Camrose, Alberta, Canada
- Height: 6 ft 3 in (191 cm)
- Weight: 220 lb (100 kg; 15 st 10 lb)
- Position: Defence
- Shot: Left
- Played for: Calgary Flames
- NHL draft: Undrafted
- Playing career: 2003–2019

Brennan Evans (born January 6, 1982) is a Canadian former professional ice hockey player. He played 13 years in the American Hockey League and with the Calgary Flames of the National Hockey League (NHL).

== Playing career ==
Evans spent four seasons in the Western Hockey League with the Seattle Thunderbirds and Kootenay Ice, winning the Memorial Cup with the Ice in 2002. The Calgary Flames signed Evans on September 30, 2003 as an undrafted free agent. Since turning pro in 2003, Evans has spent most of his career in the American Hockey League, however he was called up to the Flames on an emergency basis during the 2004 Stanley Cup Playoffs due to several injuries to Flames defencemen. He appeared in two games during the Flames series against the Detroit Red Wings. Between 2003 and 2008, Evans has played for the Lowell Lock Monsters, Binghamton Senators, and the Worcester Sharks in the AHL.

On July 11, 2008, Evans signed a two-year contract with the Anaheim Ducks. In the 2008–09 season, after attending the Ducks training camp, Evans was then assigned to AHL affiliate, the Iowa Chops, posting 15 points in 75 games for the season. Following the suspension of Iowa at season's end, Evans was loaned from the Ducks to the Toronto Marlies, affiliate of the Toronto Maple Leafs, for the entire 2009–10 campaign leading the Marlies with 15 fights for 199 penalty minutes in 79 games.

On July 11, 2010, Evans left the Ducks organization and signed a two-year deal with the St. Louis Blues. Spending the entire 2010-2011 season with the Blues AHL affiliate, Evans was limited to only 66 games due to injury and suspension. During those 66 games he collected 3 goals, 11 assists, and 113 penalty minutes. All 3 of Evans' goals came in a single game, as he scored his first career hat trick on February 23, against the Texas Stars.

Evans signed a one-year contract with the Grand Rapids Griffins for the 2012–13 AHL season. He did not score during the regular season, but he notched the game-winning goal of the deciding Game 6 of the Calder Cup Finals on June 18. On July 9, 2013, Evans re-signed a one-year contract with the Grand Rapids Griffins for the 2013–14 AHL season.

On August 4, 2015, the Texas Stars signed Evans to a one-year contract.

On September 14, 2016, Evans signalled the end of his competitive professional career, in agreeing to play with the Lacombe Generals of the Chinook Hockey League, a senior men's league in Alberta.

== Career statistics ==
=== Regular season and playoffs ===
			Regular season					Playoffs
Season	Team	League	GP	G	A	Pts	PIM	GP	G	A	Pts	PIM
1998–99	Seattle Thunderbirds	WHL	—	—	—	—	—	1	0	0	0	0
1999–00	Seattle Thunderbirds	WHL	52	1	2	3	40	1	0	0	0	0
2000–01	Seattle Thunderbirds	WHL	11	0	1	1	25	—	—	—	—	—
2000–01	Kootenay Ice	WHL	55	2	7	9	105	11	0	0	0	25
2001–02	Kootenay Ice	WHL	72	2	3	5	121	22	0	6	6	38
2002–03	Kootenay Ice	WHL	67	6	17	23	182	11	1	1	2	24
2003–04	Lowell Lock Monsters	AHL	64	1	9	10	65	—	—	—	—	—
2003–04	Calgary Flames	NHL	—	—	—	—	—	2	0	0	0	0
2004–05	Lowell Lock Monsters	AHL	51	0	7	7	79	5	0	0	0	2
2005–06	Binghamton Senators	AHL	70	3	6	9	198	—	—	—	—	—
2006–07	Worcester Sharks	AHL	75	2	14	16	170	5	0	1	1	21
2007–08	Worcester Sharks	AHL	80	1	13	14	211	—	—	—	—	—
2008–09	Iowa Chops	AHL	75	1	14	15	189	—	—	—	—	—
2009–10	Toronto Marlies	AHL	79	1	7	8	199	—	—	—	—	—
2010–11	Peoria Rivermen	AHL	66	3	11	14	113	4	0	0	0	6
2011–12	Peoria Rivermen	AHL	76	2	5	7	125	—	—	—	—	—
2012–13	Grand Rapids Griffins	AHL	76	0	7	7	148	24	2	6	8	36
2013–14	Grand Rapids Griffins	AHL	68	4	13	17	111	10	0	0	0	30
2014–15	Grand Rapids Griffins	AHL	54	1	3	4	71	16	0	2	2	31
2015–16	Texas Stars	AHL	36	0	3	3	46	1	0	0	0	0
NHL totals			—	—	—	—	—	2	0	0	0	0
