= Colin Campbell (ice hockey, born 1991) =

Canadian professional ice hockey player

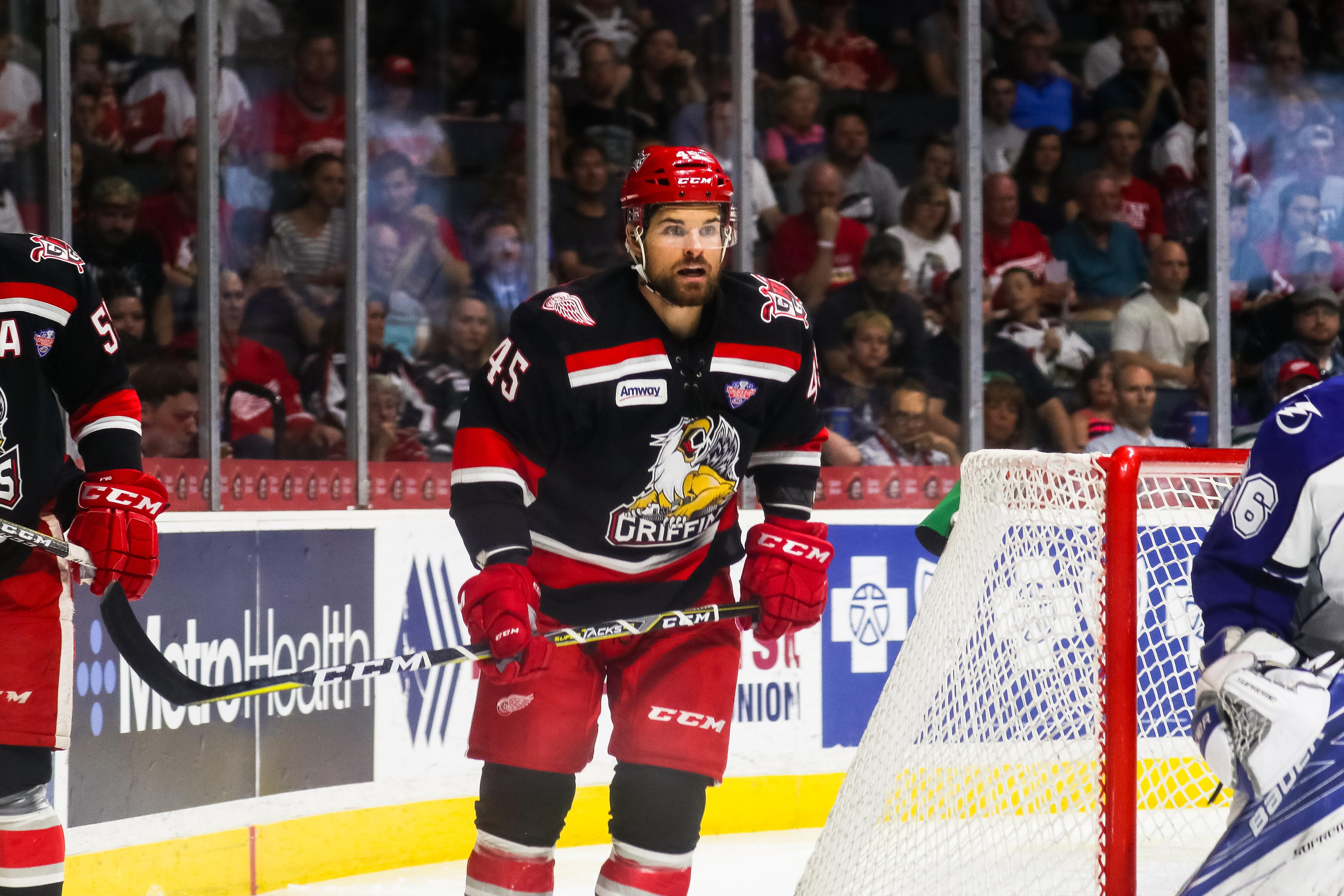
- Born: April 17, 1991 (age 35) Pickering, Ontario, Canada
- Height: 6 ft 1 in (185 cm)
- Weight: 207 lb (94 kg; 14 st 11 lb)
- Position: Winger
- Shoots: Right
- NOR team Former teams: Storhamar; Grand Rapids Griffins; Colorado Eagles; Vienna Capitals; Augsburger Panther; HC Košice; Kunlun Red Star
- NHL draft: Undrafted
- Playing career: 2014–present

Colin Campbell (born April 17, 1991) is a Canadian professional ice hockey winger for Storhamar Hockey of the EliteHockey Ligaen (NOR).

He won the Calder Cup in the American Hockey League (AHL) with the Grand Rapids Griffins in 2017. Prior to turning professional, Campbell played four seasons with Lake Superior State University before signing as an undrafted free agent with the Detroit Red Wings organization.

== Playing career ==
=== Early career ===
Although Campbell began skating before he was four years old, he also played golf, baseball, football and rugby growing up before eventually committing to hockey when he was 15. He began his minor hockey career by playing on the AAA Toronto Red Wings Midget team in the Greater Toronto Hockey League.

In 2008, Campbell graduated from Dunbarton High School while playing with the Vaughan Vipers of the Ontario Junior Hockey League. In December 2009, Campbell committed to play NCAA Division 1 hockey for Lake Superior State University. While serving as captain for the Vaughan Vipers, Campbell was invited to the 2009 Canadian Junior Hockey League Prospects Game and 2009 World Junior A Challenge. At the conclusion of the 2009–10 season, Campbell was awarded the OJHL Top Prospects Award.

Campbell began his freshman season at Lake Superior State University during the 2010–11 season. He played in 37 games and recorded seven points. After a standout sophomore season, Campbell missed the first 30 games of the 2012–13 season due to an offseason shoulder surgery.

After the conclusion of his senior year, Campbell signed a two-way entry-level contract with the Detroit Red Wings on March 17, 2014. On the same day, he also signed an amateur tryout contract with the Red Wings American Hockey League (AHL) affiliate, the Grand Rapids Griffins, to complete the season with them.

=== Professional ===
Campbell made his AHL debut on March 21, 2014. He scored his first AHL goal against the Rockford IceHogs on March 29.

In his first full season with the Griffins during the 2014–15 season, Campbell recorded five points in 44 games. Following the introduction of head coach Todd Nelson, Campbell gained time on the Griffins penalty kill and recorded a career high 18 points in 70 games during the 2015–16 season. He also recorded his first professional hat-trick during a 7–3 win over the Lake Erie Monsters on December 26, 2015.

On October 3, 2016, Campbell was released from his professional try out with the Red Wings and returned to the Griffins for the 2016–17 season. He won the Calder Cup with the Griffins that season.

Campbell re-signed a two-year contract with the Grand Rapids Griffins on August 24, 2017. He attended the Red Wings 2017 Training Camp but was returned to the Griffins for the 2017–18 season. During that season, Campbell played in his 200th AHL game on November 18, 2017, against the Rockford IceHogs and later recorded his second professional hat trick in a 6–4 win over the Cleveland Monsters to help clinch second place in the division leading up to the 2018 Calder Cup playoffs. During the 2018 Calder Cup playoffs, Campbell was suspended from Game 3 against the Manitoba Moose due to an illegal check to the head.

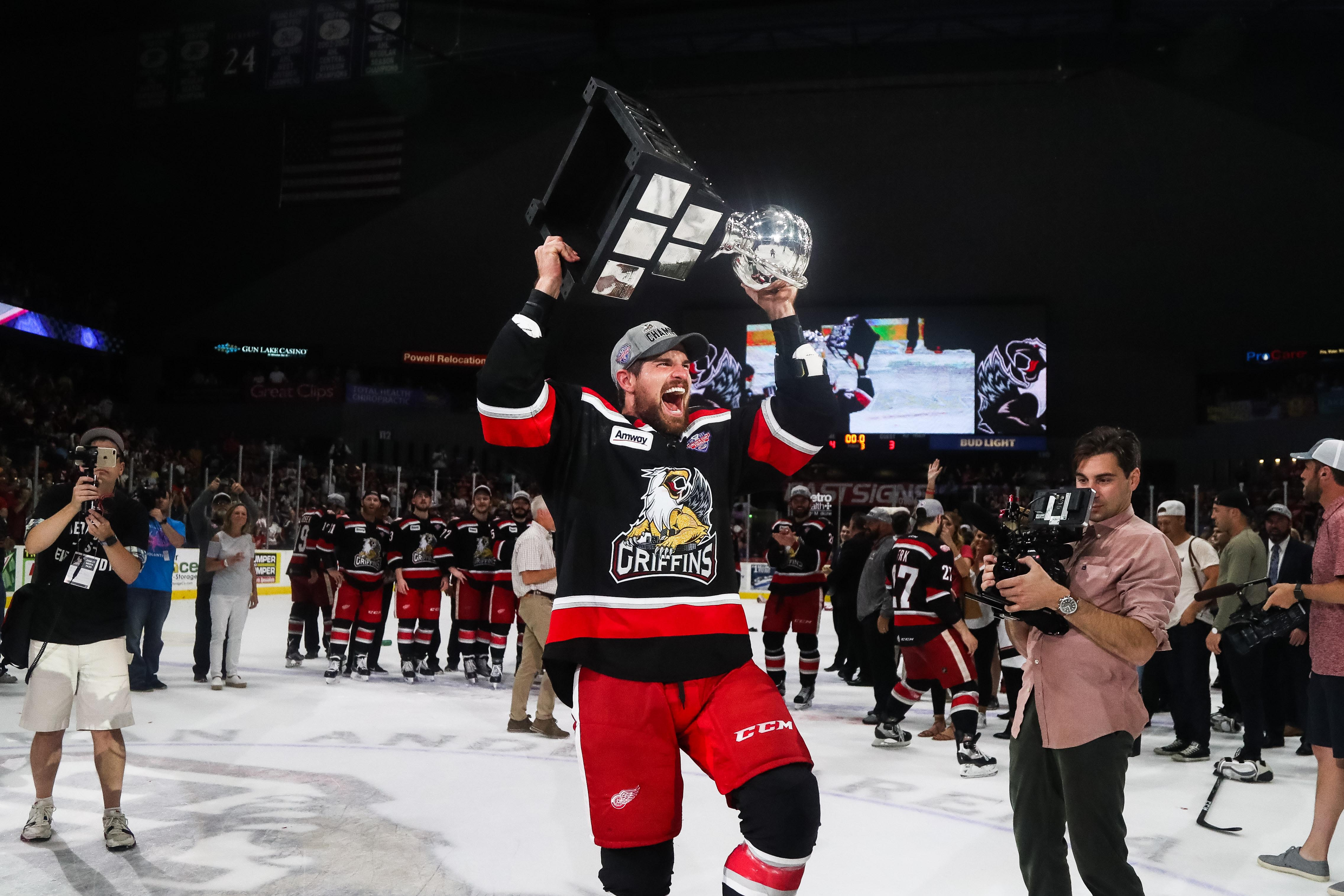
Campbell celebrating the Calder Cup victory with the Griffins in 2017.

Campbell began the 2018–19 season on the sidelines due to an upper body injury. He missed 13 games before returning to the lineup.

After six seasons within the Griffins organization, Campbell left the club as a free agent. On September 23, 2019, Campbell accepted an invitation to attend the 2019 training camp of the Colorado Avalanche. With a successful pre-season Campbell was assigned to AHL affiliate, the Colorado Eagles, and was signed to a professional try-out contract to begin the 2019–20 season on October 4, 2019. Adding a veteran presence to the depth forwards for the Eagles, Campbell was later signed to a one-year AHL contract in Colorado on November 25, 2019. In 48 games, Campbell contributed offensively with 10 goals and 26 points, before the season was abruptly cancelled due to the COVID-19 pandemic.

As a free agent and with the following North American season to be delayed, Campbell opted to sign his first contract abroad by agreeing to a one-year deal with Austrian club, Vienna Capitals of the ICE Hockey League, on September 4, 2020. On June 25, 2021, he signed a one-year contract with Augsburger Panther of the Deutsche Eishockey Liga (DEL). On June 25, 2022 Campbell was signed by HC Košice of Slovakia's Tipos Extraliga. However, his stint with HC Košice was short and on December 25, he signed with Kunlun Red Star of the Kontinental Hockey League (KHL) until the end of the 2022–23 season.

After three seasons with Kunlun, Campbell left the club as a free agent and was signed to a one-year deal with Norwegian club, Storhamar Hockey, on August 3, 2025.

== Career statistics ==
=== Regular season and playoffs ===
			Regular season					Playoffs
Season	Team	League	GP	G	A	Pts	PIM	GP	G	A	Pts	PIM
2008–09	Vaughan Vipers	OJHL	47	24	42	66	39	9	7	2	9	0
2009–10	Vaughan Vipers	OJAHL	46	32	44	76	55	5	3	2	5	6
2010–11	Lake Superior State Univ.	NCAA	37	4	3	7	12	—	—	—	—	—
2011–12	Lake Superior State Univ.	NCAA	37	9	16	25	32	—	—	—	—	—
2012–13	Lake Superior State Univ.	NCAA	9	0	3	3	4	—	—	—	—	—
2013–14	Lake Superior State Univ.	NCAA	36	14	15	29	26	—	—	—	—	—
2013–14	Grand Rapids Griffins	AHL	13	1	0	1	5	3	0	0	0	2
2014–15	Grand Rapids Griffins	AHL	44	2	3	5	29	7	0	1	1	2
2015–16	Grand Rapids Griffins	AHL	70	10	8	18	58	9	1	1	2	7
2016–17	Grand Rapids Griffins	AHL	57	9	11	20	35	17	0	4	4	15
2017–18	Grand Rapids Griffins	AHL	72	10	25	35	56	4	0	0	0	2
2018–19	Grand Rapids Griffins	AHL	63	8	11	19	24	5	3	0	3	2
2019–20	Colorado Eagles	AHL	48	10	16	26	21	—	—	—	—	—
2020–21	Vienna Capitals	ICEHL	23	13	13	26	26	1	0	1	1	0
2021–22	Augsburger Panther	DEL	41	6	13	19	22	—	—	—	—	—
2022–23	HC Košice	Slovak	23	11	14	25	8	—	—	—	—	—
2022–23	Kunlun Red Star	KHL	18	5	4	9	10	—	—	—	—	—
2023–24	Kunlun Red Star	KHL	53	8	9	17	20	—	—	—	—	—
2024–25	Kunlun Red Star	KHL	55	14	8	22	16	—	—	—	—	—
AHL totals			367	50	74	124	228	45	4	6	10	30
KHL totals			126	27	21	48	46	—	—	—	—	—

=== International ===
Year	Team	Event	Result	GP	G	A	Pts	PIM
2009	Canada East U19	WJAC	4th	4	1	2	2	4
Junior totals				4	1	2	2	4

== Honours and achievements ==
Award	Year	Ref
OJHL
OJHL Top Prospects Award	2010	
AHL
Calder Cup champion	2017	
