= Brendan Smith (ice hockey) =

Canadian ice hockey player (born 1989)

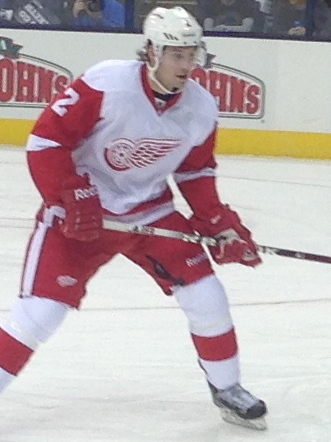
- Smith with the Detroit Red Wings in 2013
- Born: February 8, 1989 (age 37) Etobicoke, Ontario, Canada
- Height: 6 ft 1 in (185 cm)
- Weight: 198 lb (90 kg; 14 st 2 lb)
- Position: Defence/left wing
- Shoots: Left
- NHL team Former teams: Free agent Detroit Red Wings; New York Rangers; Carolina Hurricanes; New Jersey Devils; Dallas Stars; Columbus Blue Jackets
- NHL draft: 27th overall, 2007; Detroit Red Wings
- Playing career: 2010–present

Brendan Smith (born February 8, 1989) is a Canadian professional ice hockey defenceman who is currently an unrestricted free agent. He most recently played for the Columbus Blue Jackets of the National Hockey League (NHL). Although he is listed as a defenceman, Smith has also played forward professionally. Smith was drafted 27th overall by the Detroit Red Wings in the 2007 NHL entry draft and was previously a finalist for the Hobey Baker Award.

== Playing career ==
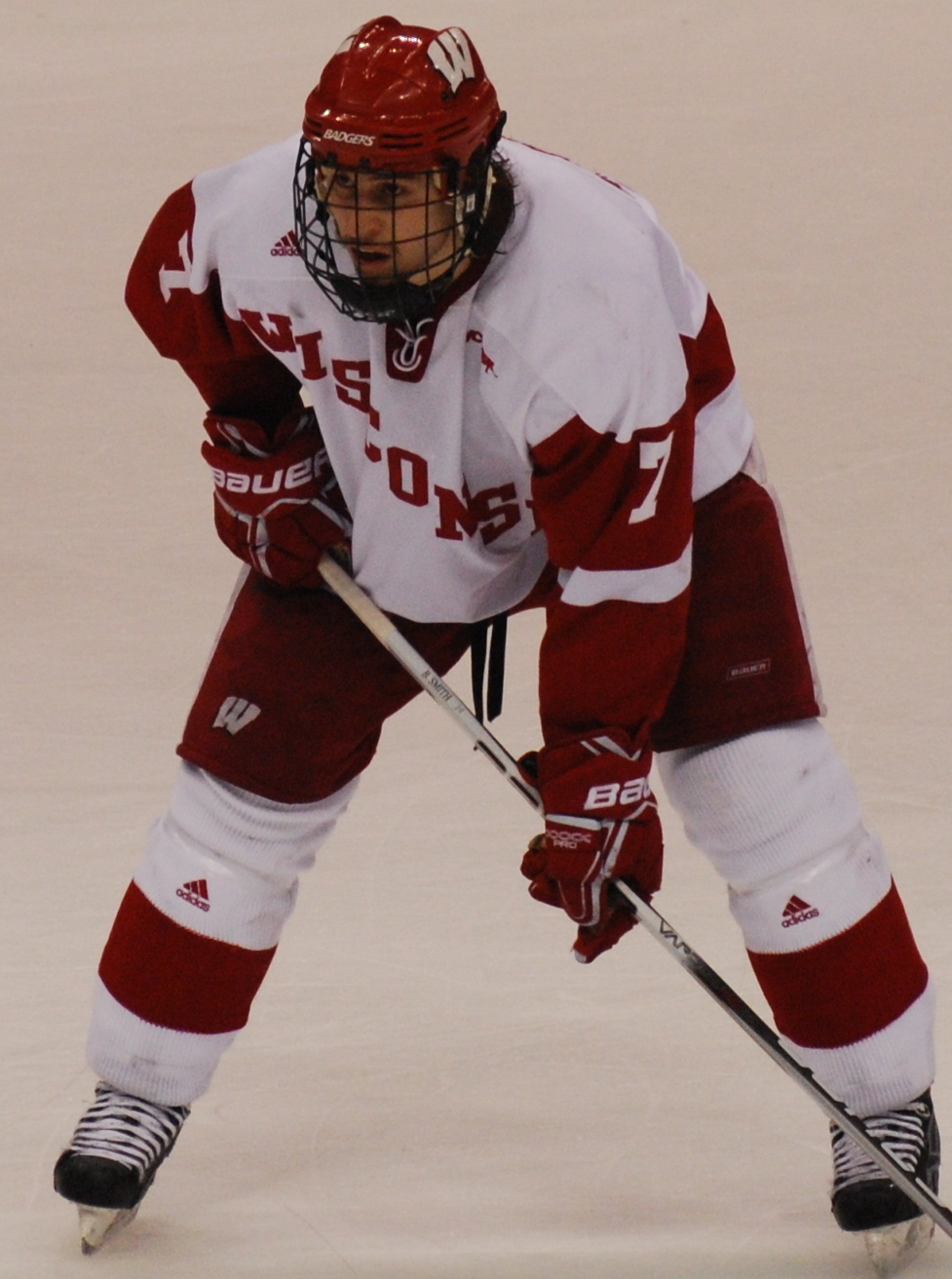
Smith playing for the Wisconsin Badgers in the 2010 NCAA Division I Men's Ice Hockey West Regional Final

Prior to the 2007 Draft, Smith was a member of the Ontario Provincial Junior A Hockey League's St. Michael's Buzzers. In 2007, he finished his second season with St. Michael's leading all defencemen in points with 36. Smith was selected to participate in the CJAHL All-Star Game in 2006. Smith played for Canada East at the World Junior A Challenge 2006, helping his team win silver. Smith played three seasons for the University of Wisconsin–Madison before he signed a three-year entry-level contract with the Detroit Red Wings, on May 27, 2010.

=== Detroit Red Wings ===
Smith made his NHL debut on November 17, 2011, against the San Jose Sharks. Smith was called up on February 27, 2012, to replace Mike Commodore, who had been traded to the Tampa Bay Lightning on the same day. He scored his first NHL goal against Josh Harding of the Minnesota Wild at the Joe Louis Arena on March 2, 2012.

Smith appeared in 34 games for Detroit during the lock-out shortened 2012–13 NHL season. He would score his first career Stanley Cup playoff goal on May 6, 2013, during game four of Detroit's Western Conference quarterfinal series against the Anaheim Ducks.

On July 16, 2013, the Detroit Red Wings re-signed Smith to a two-year, $2.525 million contract. On June 30, 2015, the Red Wings re-signed Smith to a two-year, $5.5 million contract.

=== New York Rangers ===
During the final year of his contract and approaching free agency in the 2016–17 season, Smith was traded to the New York Rangers in exchange for a third-round pick in the 2017 NHL entry draft and a second-round pick in the 2018 NHL entry draft on February 28, 2017. Smith provided a stability to the Rangers blueline to finish the season with 4 points in 18 games.

On June 29, 2017, Smith agreed to forfeit his impending free agent status in signing to a four-year, $17.4 million contract to remain with the Rangers. On Smith reportedly showed up to 2017 training camp out of shape, and the Rangers as a team struggled. On February 8, 2018, the Rangers placed Smith on waivers due to his struggling play, and then assigned him to their American Hockey League (AHL) affiliate, the Hartford Wolf Pack after he went unclaimed. Shortly after arriving in Hartford, Smith broke his hand in a fight with teammate Vinni Lettieri during a practice, ending his season.

In the 2018 season, under new head coach David Quinn, Smith saw an improved play and fewer penalties with reduced ice time. In an effort to keep Smith in the lineup despite a crowded blue-line, Quinn dressed him as a forward several times throughout the season. Smith had previously played forward briefly while in juniors. In the 2019–20 season, Smith played exclusively as a winger before switching back to defenceman permanently after the Rangers traded Brady Skjei.

=== Carolina Hurricanes ===
After five seasons within the Rangers organization, Smith left as a free agent and on July 29, 2021, he was signed to a one-year, $800,000 contract with the Carolina Hurricanes.

=== New Jersey Devils ===
Smith left the Hurricanes at the conclusion of his contract and was signed to a two-year, $2.2 million contract with the New Jersey Devils on July 13, 2022. He scored his first goal as a Devil a year and a half into the two-year deal, in a 6–2 victory over the Ottawa Senators on December 29, 2023, when he scored on a breakaway immediately after exiting the penalty box.

=== Dallas Stars ===
On July 1, 2024, Smith signed a one-year, $1 million contract with the Dallas Stars. In the 2024–25 season, Smith added a physical veteran presence to the blueline, collecting 1 goal and 6 points through 32 appearances with the Stars.

=== Columbus Blue Jackets ===
As a free agent from the Stars and aspiring to extend his professional career, Smith went un-signed over the summer. Approaching the 2025–26 season, Smith accepted an invitation from the Columbus Blue Jackets to attend training camp on a professional tryout (PTO) on August 19, 2025. While he did not make the team's roster out of training camp, he signed a PTO with Columbus' AHL affiliate, the Cleveland Monsters, on October 13. On November 24, Columbus signed Smith to a one-year contract, extending his NHL career.

== Personal life ==
Smith was born and raised in Etobicoke, Ontario with his parents Deidre and Lester and his two brothers, Rory and Reilly. The three all played minor hockey in the Mimico neighbourhood with the Faustina Sports Club, then all played for the St. Michael's Buzzers minor juniors. He faced his brother Reilly in the first round of the 2014 Stanley Cup playoffs when his Red Wings faced Reilly's Boston Bruins.

Smith and his wife Samantha have a son and daughter together.

== Career statistics ==
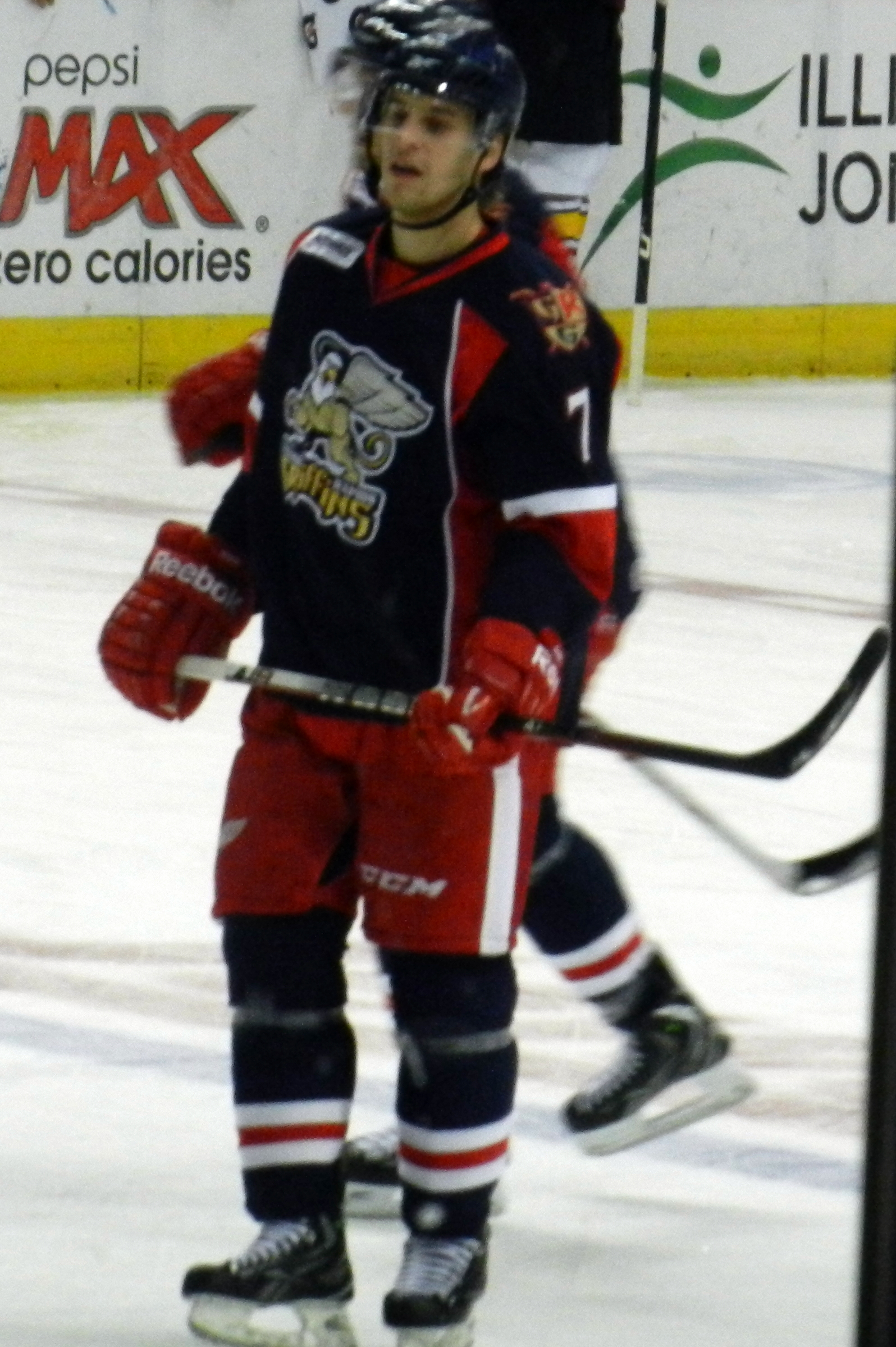
Smith playing with the Grand Rapids Griffins

=== Regular season and playoffs ===
			Regular season					Playoffs
Season	Team	League	GP	G	A	Pts	PIM	GP	G	A	Pts	PIM
2005–06	St. Michael's Buzzers	OPJHL	39	5	21	26	55	17	1	5	6	44
2006–07	St. Michael's Buzzers	OPJHL	39	12	24	36	90	16	6	14	20	30
2007–08	University of Wisconsin	WCHA	22	2	10	12	26	—	—	—	—	—
2008–09	University of Wisconsin	WCHA	31	9	14	23	75	—	—	—	—	—
2009–10	University of Wisconsin	WCHA	42	15	37	52	76	—	—	—	—	—
2010–11	Grand Rapids Griffins	AHL	63	12	20	32	124	—	—	—	—	—
2011–12	Detroit Red Wings	NHL	14	1	6	7	13	—	—	—	—	—
2011–12	Grand Rapids Griffins	AHL	57	10	24	34	90	—	—	—	—	—
2012–13	Grand Rapids Griffins	AHL	32	5	15	20	49	—	—	—	—	—
2012–13	Detroit Red Wings	NHL	34	0	8	8	36	14	2	3	5	10
2013–14	Detroit Red Wings	NHL	71	5	14	19	68	5	0	0	0	8
2014–15	Detroit Red Wings	NHL	76	4	9	13	68	5	0	0	0	6
2015–16	Detroit Red Wings	NHL	63	3	12	15	62	3	0	1	1	0
2016–17	Detroit Red Wings	NHL	33	2	3	5	34	—	—	—	—	—
2016–17	New York Rangers	NHL	18	1	3	4	29	12	0	4	4	20
2017–18	New York Rangers	NHL	44	1	7	8	69	—	—	—	—	—
2017–18	Hartford Wolf Pack	AHL	11	0	2	2	8	—	—	—	—	—
2018–19	New York Rangers	NHL	63	4	9	13	71	—	—	—	—	—
2019–20	New York Rangers	NHL	62	3	5	8	71	3	0	0	0	4
2020–21	New York Rangers	NHL	48	5	5	10	73	—	—	—	—	—
2021–22	Carolina Hurricanes	NHL	45	4	4	8	36	14	1	3	4	12
2022–23	New Jersey Devils	NHL	60	0	5	5	63	3	0	1	1	12
2023–24	New Jersey Devils	NHL	63	5	10	15	61	—	—	—	—	—
2024–25	Dallas Stars	NHL	32	1	5	6	33	—	—	—	—	—
2025–26	Cleveland Monsters	AHL	11	0	1	1	8	—	—	—	—	—
2025–26	Columbus Blue Jackets	NHL	15	0	2	2	11	—	—	—	—	—
NHL totals			741	39	107	146	798	59	3	12	15	72

=== International ===
Year	Team	Event	Result	GP	G	A	Pts	PIM
2006	Canada Ontario	U17	5th	5	0	4	4	4
Junior totals				5	0	4	4	4

== Awards and honours ==
Award	Year	Ref
College
All-WCHA First Team	2009–10	
AHCA West First-Team All-American	2009–10	
NCAA All-Tournament Team	2010	

Sporting positions
Preceded by Jakub Kindl	Detroit Red Wings first-round draft pick 2007	Succeeded by Thomas McCollum
Awards and achievements
Preceded by Chay Genoway	WCHA Defensive Player of the Year; 2009–10	Succeeded by Justin Schultz
