= Bob McNamara (sports executive) =

Canadian ice hockey player and executive

Bob McNamara (born August 6, 1961 in Toronto, Ontario) is a former professional ice hockey player and executive. He is the former general manager of the Grand Rapids Griffins of the International Hockey League and the American Hockey League and a former goaltender in the minor leagues.

== Playing career ==
McNamara attended the University of Notre Dame and played for their ice hockey team, earning a bachelor's degree in economics in 1983. After college, McNamara signed with the Buffalo Sabres of the National Hockey League, playing for the Rochester Americans, Buffalo's American Hockey League affiliate.

In 1986, McNamara signed with the Milwaukee Admirals of the International Hockey League.

== Front office ==
McNamara's first front office experience came as the assistant general manager for the Cleveland Lumberjacks of the IHL (IHL). On January 26, 1996, he was named the director of hockey operations and general manager of the Grand Rapids Griffins of the IHL. McNamara won the IHL's General Manager of the Year award for his efforts in building the Griffins in their inaugural season. McNamara also was instrumental in constructing the affiliation between the Griffins and the Detroit Red Wings of the NHL. After 15 seasons, McNamara announced he would not return for the 2011–12 season. In September 2011, he was introduced as the president and governor of the Hamilton Bulldogs. From 2012 to 2017, he was the president of the Quad City Mallards in the ECHL. In 2021, he was named the general manager of the Evansville Thunderbolts in the Southern Professional Hockey League.
