= Triston Grant =

Canadian ice hockey player (born 1984)

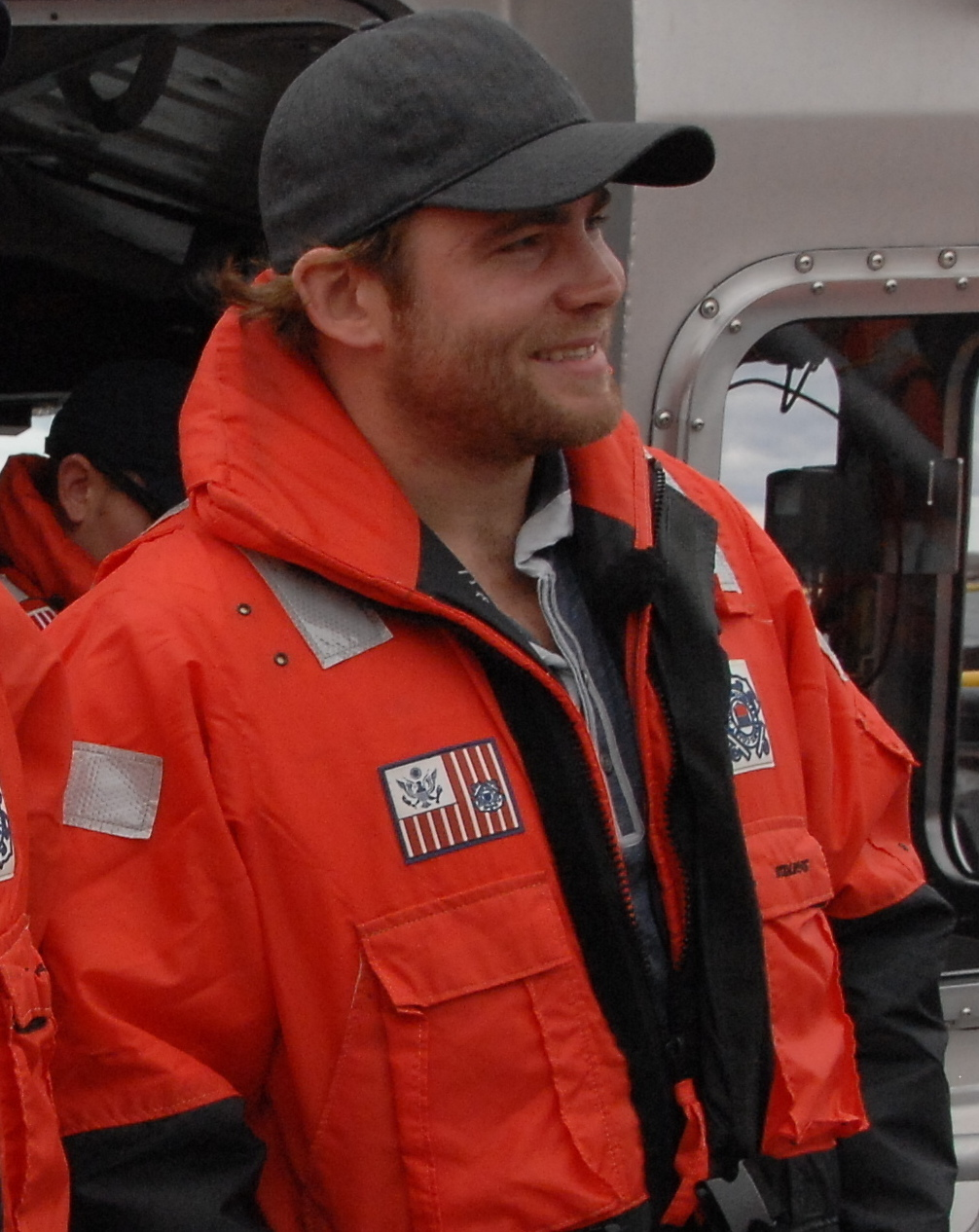
- Grant in 2014
- Born: February 2, 1984 (age 42) Neepawa, Manitoba, Canada
- Height: 6 ft 1 in (185 cm)
- Weight: 221 lb (100 kg; 15 st 11 lb)
- Position: Left wing
- Shot: Left
- Played for: Philadelphia Flyers; Nashville Predators
- NHL draft: 286th overall, 2004; Philadelphia Flyers
- Playing career: 2005–2018

Triston Grant (born February 2, 1984) is a Canadian former professional ice hockey left winger who played 11 games in the National Hockey League for the Philadelphia Flyers and Nashville Predators between 2006 and 2009. The rest of his career, which lasted from 2005 to 2018, was spent in the minor leagues.

== Playing career ==
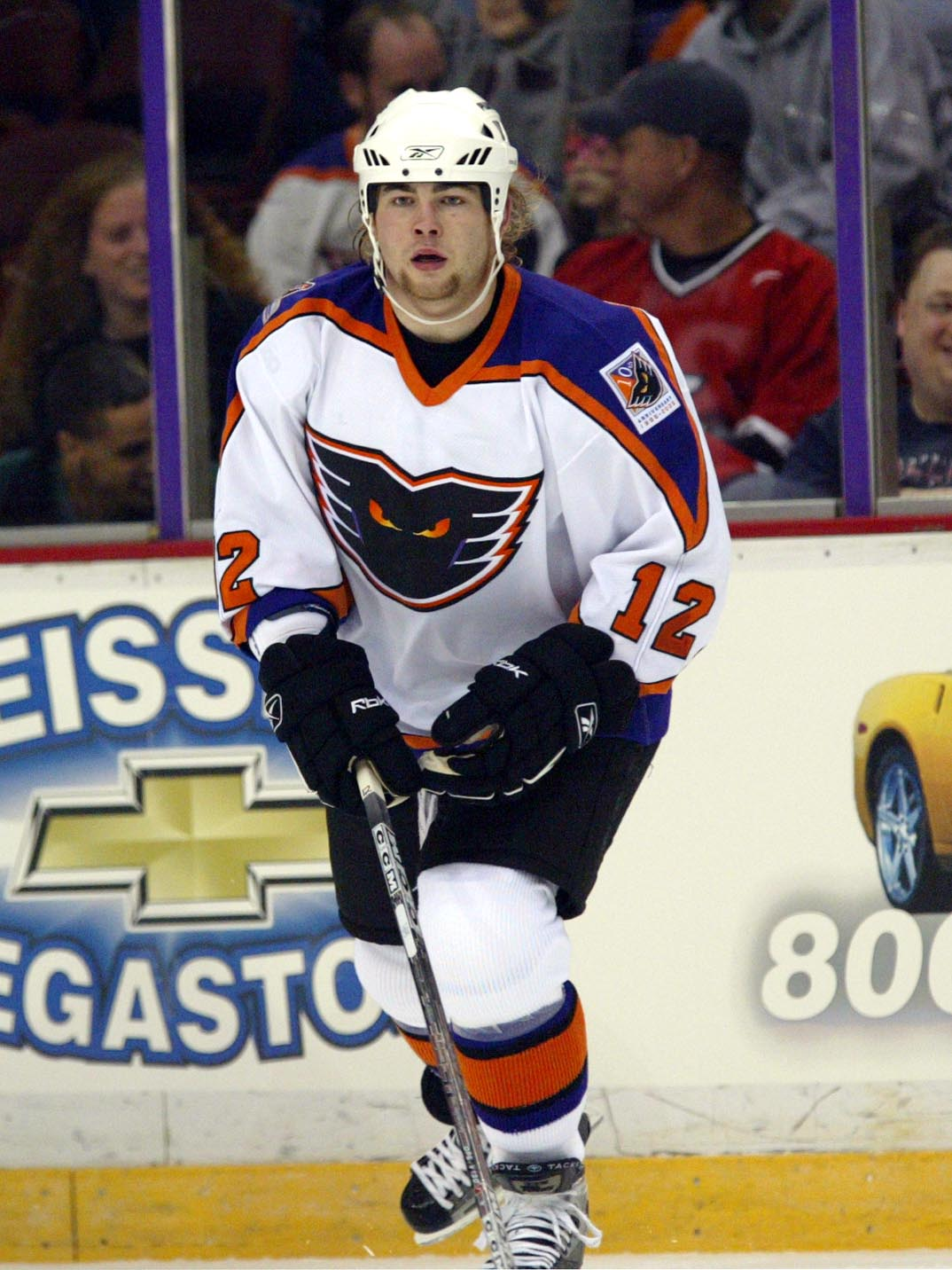
Grant with the Philadelphia Phantoms in 2005

Grant spent five seasons in the Western Hockey League with the Lethbridge Hurricanes and Vancouver Giants. Drafted 286th overall in the 2004 NHL entry draft by the Philadelphia Flyers, Grant has spent most of his career in the American Hockey League. However, he was called up early in the 2006–07 NHL season to the Philadelphia Flyers, and made his NHL debut on October 26, 2006. Between 2005 and 2012, Grant played for the Philadelphia Phantoms, Milwaukee Admirals, Rochester Americans, and the Oklahoma City Barons in the AHL.

Signed on July 9, 2012, by Grand Rapids Griffins for the 2012–13 AHL season, Grant won the Calder Cup with the Griffins in 2013. On July 9, 2013, Grant re-signed with the Griffins for the 2013–14 AHL season.

On July 21, 2014, Grant signed a one-year deal with the Milwaukee Admirals as a free agent. During the 2014–15 season, Grant posted career highs in goals (13), assists (13), and points (26). On July 6, 2015, Grant returned to the Grand Rapids Griffins for a second stint, signing a one-year contract.

== Career statistics ==
			Regular season					Playoffs
Season	Team	League	GP	G	A	Pts	PIM	GP	G	A	Pts	PIM
2000–01	Neepawa Natives	MJHL	34	2	2	4	106	—	—	—	—	—
2000–01	Lethbridge Hurricanes	WHL	23	2	0	2	75	5	0	0	0	11
2001–02	Lethbridge Hurricanes	WHL	36	8	1	9	110	—	—	—	—	—
2001–02	Vancouver Giants	WHL	21	2	4	6	53	—	—	—	—	—
2002–03	Vancouver Giants	WHL	72	10	10	20	200	4	0	0	0	10
2003–04	Vancouver Giants	WHL	69	10	8	18	267	11	1	1	2	33
2004–05	Vancouver Giants	WHL	70	20	12	32	193	6	1	0	1	8
2005–06	Philadelphia Phantoms	AHL	64	2	3	5	190	—	—	—	—	—
2006–07	Philadelphia Phantoms	AHL	61	5	6	11	199	—	—	—	—	—
2006–07	Philadelphia Flyers	NHL	8	0	1	1	10	—	—	—	—	—
2007–08	Philadelphia Phantoms	AHL	72	10	11	21	181	12	0	2	2	34
2008–09	Milwaukee Admirals	AHL	55	3	8	11	153	11	1	1	2	12
2009–10	Milwaukee Admirals	AHL	74	12	13	25	236	5	0	2	2	16
2009–10	Nashville Predators	NHL	3	0	0	0	9	—	—	—	—	—
2010–11	Rochester Americans	AHL	56	7	6	13	144	—	—	—	—	—
2011–12	Oklahoma City Barons	AHL	53	11	4	15	163	7	0	0	0	29
2012–13	Grand Rapids Griffins	AHL	75	4	6	10	196	24	2	2	4	26
2013–14	Grand Rapids Griffins	AHL	51	6	10	16	103	4	0	0	0	4
2014–15	Milwaukee Admirals	AHL	73	13	13	26	123	—	—	—	—	—
2015–16	Grand Rapids Griffins	AHL	6	0	0	0	19	—	—	—	—	—
2016–17	Wichita Thunder	ECHL	4	0	0	0	17	—	—	—	—	—
2016–17	Binghamton Senators	AHL	1	0	0	0	2	—	—	—	—	—
2016–17	Rapid City Rush	ECHL	43	6	5	11	104	—	—	—	—	—
2017–18	Quad City Mallards	ECHL	25	8	5	13	93	—	—	—	—	—
AHL totals			641	73	80	153	1709	63	3	7	10	121
NHL totals			11	0	1	1	19	—	—	—	—	—
