= List of Grand Rapids Griffins seasons =

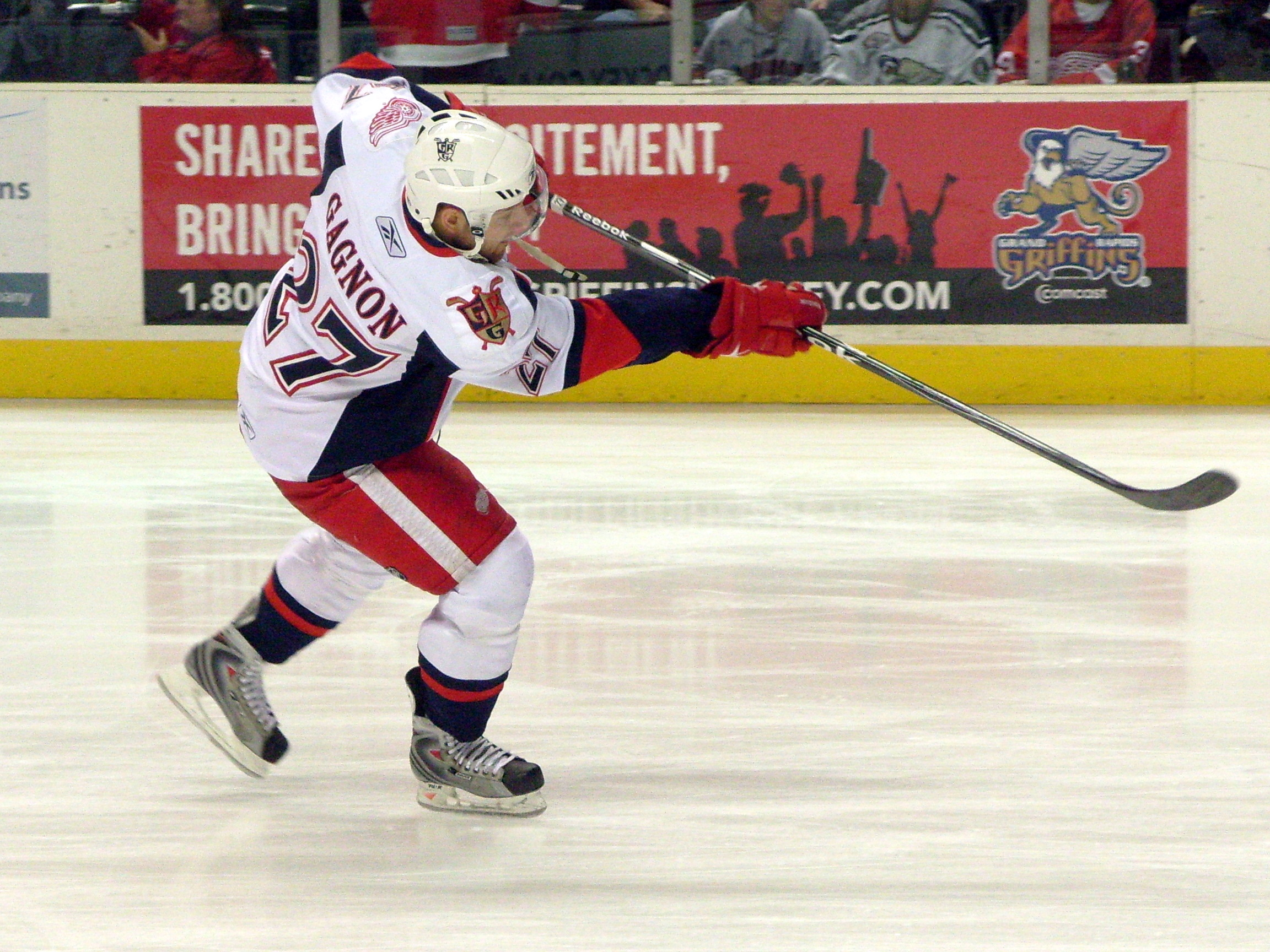
Aaron Gagnon played for the Griffins during their 2008–09 season, in which the team advanced to the AHL's North Division Finals.

The Grand Rapids Griffins are a professional ice hockey team based in Grand Rapids, Michigan. The team is a member of the Central Division in the Western Conference of the American Hockey League (AHL). The Griffins began as an independent expansion franchise in the International Hockey League (IHL) in 1996. After failing to qualify for the IHL playoffs in their third season, the Griffins entered into an affiliation agreement with the Ottawa Senators of the National Hockey League (NHL). In the following season, the team finished the regular season in first place in the Eastern Conference and won the conference in the playoffs before losing to the Chicago Wolves in the Turner Cup Finals. In the 2000–01 season – the IHL's last before folding – Grand Rapids captured the Fred A. Huber Trophy as the team with the best regular season record.

Grand Rapids, along with five other IHL teams, joined the AHL in 2001. The Griffins won the West Division in their first season in the league, which was also their last as an affiliate of the Senators. On January 24, 2002, the franchise signed an affiliation agreement with the NHL's Detroit Red Wings, which has since been extended. The Griffins' first season as an affiliate of the Red Wings resulted in the team's winning the Central Division in the regular season and reaching the Western Conference finals in the playoffs, where they lost to the Houston Aeros in seven games. The 2005–06 team won the Macgregor Kilpatrick Trophy for finishing the regular season with the best record; in the playoffs they again lost in the Western Conference finals, this time to the Milwaukee Admirals.

In their 29 seasons in the IHL and AHL, the Grand Rapids Griffins have won over half of the games they have played and qualified for the playoffs in 19 seasons. The Griffins have won the Calder Cup following the 2012–13 and 2016–17 seasons.

== Season-by-season results ==
=== International Hockey League (1996–2001) ===
Turner Cup Champions †	Fred A. Huber Trophy *	Conference champions ^	Division champions ¤

IHL season	Conference	Division	Regular season								Postseason					
IHL season	Conference	Division	Finish	GP	W	L	SOL	Pts^{[a]}	GF	GA	GP	W	L	GF	GA	Result
1996–97	—	Northeast	5th	82	40	30	12	92	244	246	5	2	3	12	14	Lost in Conference Quarterfinals, 2–3 (Solar Bears)
1997–98	Eastern	Northeast	3rd	82	38	31	13	89	225	242	3	0	3	7	13	Lost in Conference Quarterfinals, 0–3 (Cyclones)
1998–99	Eastern	Northeast	4th	82	34	40	8	76	256	281	Did not qualify					
1999–00	Eastern ^	—	1st	82	51	22	9	111	254	200	17	10	7	50	41	Won in Conference Semifinals, 4–2 (Lumberjacks); Won in Conference Finals, 4–1 (Cyclones); Lost in Turner Cup Finals, 2–4 (Wolves)
2000–01	Eastern	—	1st	82	53	22	7	113 *	279	196	10	6	4	38	26	Won in Conference Semifinals, 4–0 (Lumberjacks); Lost in Conference Finals, 2–4 (Solar Bears)
IHL Totals (5 seasons)				410	216	145	49	481	1,258	1,165	35	18	17	107	94	4 playoff appearances

=== American Hockey League (2001–present) ===
Calder Cup champions †	Macgregor Kilpatrick Trophy *	Robert W. Clarke Trophy ^	Division champions ¤

AHL season	Conference	Division	Regular season										Postseason					
AHL season	Conference	Division	Finish	GP	W	L	T	OTL	SOL	Pts^{[a]}	GF	GA	GP	W	L	GF	GA	Result
2001–02	Western	West ¤	1st	80	42	27	11	0	—	95	217	178	5	2	3	11	12	Lost in Conference Quarterfinals, 2–3 (Wolves)
2002–03	Western	Central ¤	1st	80	48	22	8	2	—	106	240	177	15	10	5	36	30	Won in Conference Quarterfinals, 3–1 (Penguins); Won in Conference Semifinals, 4–0 (Wolves); Lost in Conference Finals, 3–4 (Aeros)
2003–04	Western	West	2nd	80	44	28	8	0	—	96	196	166	4	0	4	6	17	Lost in Division Semifinals, 0–4 (Wolves)
2004–05	Western	West	5th	80	41	35	—	2	2	86	200	200	Did not qualify					
2005–06	Western	North ¤	1st	80	55	20	—	1	4	115 *	323	247	15	8	7	44	52	Won in Division Semifinals, 4–0 (Marlies); Won in Division Finals, 4–3 (Moose); Lost in Conference Finals, 0–4 (Admirals)
2006–07	Western	North	4th	80	37	32	—	6	5	85	226	244	7	3	4	13	16	Lost in Division Semifinals, 3–4 (Moose)
2007–08	Western	North	5th	80	31	41	—	2	6	70	210	245	Did not qualify					
2008–09	Western	North	3rd	80	43	25	—	6	6	98	255	226	10	4	6	27	25	Won in Division Semifinals, 4–2 (Bulldogs); Lost in Division Finals, 0–4 (Moose)
2009–10	Western	North	7th	80	34	39	—	3	4	75	244	265	Did not qualify					
2010–11	Western	North	6th	80	36	34	—	2	8	82	227	254	Did not qualify					
2011–12	Western	North	4th	76	33	32	—	7	4	77	245	249	Did not qualify					
2012–13	Western ^	Midwest ¤	1st	76	42	26	—	4	4	92	234	205	24	15	9	80	61	Won in Conference Quarterfinals, 3–2 (Aeros); Won in Conference Semifinals, 4–2 (Marlies); Won in Conference Finals, 4–3 (Barons); Won in Calder Cup Finals, 4–2 (Crunch)
2013–14	Western	Midwest	2nd	76	46	23	—	2	5	99	238	187	10	5	5	23	31	Won in Conference Quarterfinals, 3–1 (Heat); Lost in Conference Semifinals, 2–4 (Stars)
2014–15	Western	Midwest	2nd	76	46	22	—	2	6	100	249	185	16	9	7	48	46	Won in Conference Quarterfinals, 3–2 (Marlies); Won in Conference Semifinals, 4–1 (IceHogs); Lost in Conference Finals, 2–4 (Comets)
2015–16	Western	Central	4th	76	44	30	—	1	1	90	238	195	9	5	4	29	21	Won in Conference Quarterfinals, 3–0 (Admirals); Lost in Conference Semifinals, 2–4 (Monsters)
2016–17	Western^	Central	2nd	76	47	23	—	1	5	100	251	190	19	15	4	73	55	Won in Division Semifinals, 3–0 (Admirals); Won in Division Finals, 4–1 (Wolves); Won in Conference Finals, 4–1 (Barracuda); Won in Calder Cup Finals, 4–2 (Crunch)
2017–18	Western	Central	2nd	76	42	25	—	2	7	93	237	210	5	2	3	14	15	Lost in Division Semifinals, 2–3 (Moose)
2018–19	Western	Central	4th	76	38	27	—	7	4	87	217	222	5	2	3	17	15	Lost in Division Semifinals, 2–3 (Wolves)
2019–20	Western	Central	3rd	63	29	27	—	3	4	65	177	193	Season cancelled due to the COVID-19 pandemic					
2020–21	Western	Central	3rd	32	16	12	—	3	1	36	96	97	No playoffs were held					
2021–22	Western	Central	7th	76	33	35	—	6	2	74	209	240	Did not qualify					
2022–23	Western	Central	7th	72	28	36	—	4	4	64	194	255	Did not qualify					
2023–24	Western	Central	2nd	72	37	23	—	8	4	86	208	202	9	5	4	24	28	Won in Division Semifinals, 3–1 (IceHogs); Lost in Division Finals, 2–3 (Admirals)
2024–25	Western	Central	3rd	72	37	29	—	4	2	80	202	203	3	0	3	6	13	Lost in Division Semifinals, 0–3 (Stars)
AHL Totals (24 seasons)				1,795	929	673	27	78	88	2,054	5,052	5,035	159	79	64	460	440	15 playoff appearances
Totals (29 seasons)				2,205	1,145	818	27	127	137	2,525	6,310	6,200	194	91	88	567	534	19 playoff appearances

== Notes ==
- ^{a} Wins are worth two points, losses are worth zero points and ties, overtime losses and shootout losses are worth one point.
