= Tom McCollum =

American ice hockey player (born 1989)

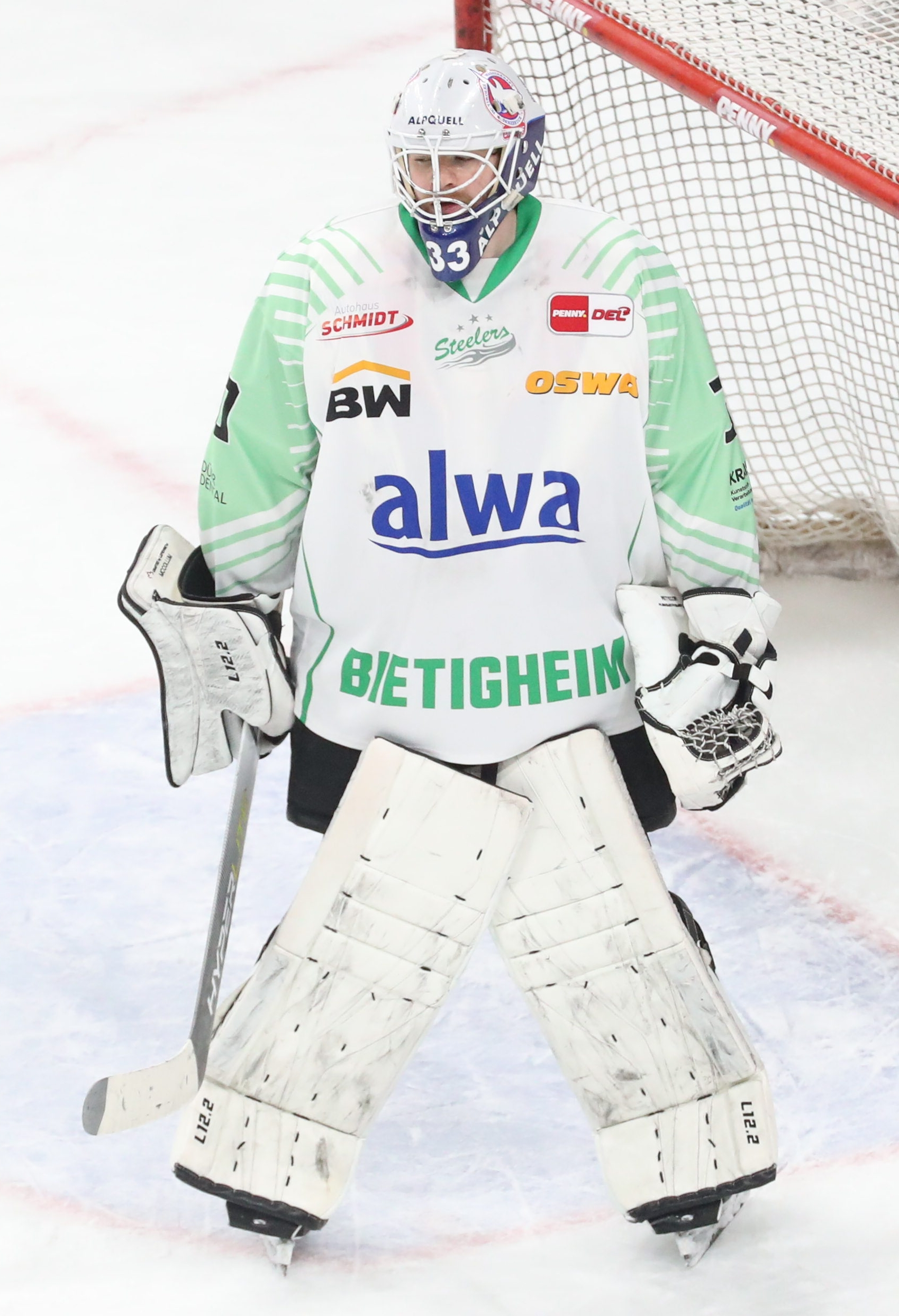
- McCollum with the Bietigheim Steelers in 2022
- Born: December 7, 1989 (age 36) Amherst, New York, U.S.
- Height: 6 ft 2 in (188 cm)
- Weight: 210 lb (95 kg; 15 st 0 lb)
- Position: Goaltender
- Catches: Left
- EIHL team Former teams: Belfast Giants; Detroit Red Wings; HC TWK Innsbruck; Bietigheim Steelers; Eisbären Regensburg
- NHL draft: 30th overall, 2008; Detroit Red Wings
- Playing career: 2009–present

Thomas McCollum (born December 7, 1989) is an American professional ice hockey goaltender currently playing for the Belfast Giants of the Elite Ice Hockey League. McCollum was drafted 30th overall by the Detroit Red Wings in the 2008 NHL entry draft. McCollum was born in Amherst, New York, but grew up in Sanborn, New York.

== Playing career ==
=== Amateur ===
McCollum started playing goalie when, during a mite hockey game, the goalie on his team quit; McCollum switched from defence and took over in the net at the next practice.

Drafted by the Guelph Storm in the OHL draft, McCollum had the choice of playing with a Junior A team near his hometown of Sanborn, New York, but instead opted to play major junior for the Storm, citing the challenge of the OHL as a strong deciding factor. He also was shown great support from Guelph residents at a restaurant before signing.

Playing for the Storm in his rookie season in 2006–07, McCollum was named an All-Star, recording 5 shutouts, a 2.39 goals against average (GAA), and a .918 save percentage. He posted similar numbers the following season, in 2007–08, including a 1.91 GAA, .937 save percentage performance in the playoffs as Guelph was ousted in the second round. He was nominated for the OHL Goaltender of the Year, awarded to Mike Murphy of the Belleville Bulls, in addition to being named the Storm's Academic Player of the Year. Going into the 2008 NHL entry draft, McCollum was the first ranked North American goaltender by the NHL Central Scouting Bureau. He would be drafted 30th overall by the Detroit Red Wings in the 2008 NHL entry draft, the second goaltender selected, behind Chet Pickard, who was chosen 18th overall by the Nashville Predators.

McCollum returned to the Storm for a third OHL season in 2008-09, however, he was traded to the Brampton Battalion following his efforts at the 2009 World Junior Championships. McCollum had a 17–10–4 record with a 2.23 GAA and a .926 save percentage with Guelph.

McCollum took over the starters role with the Battalion, and posted a 17–6–0 record with Brampton, as he had a 1.94 GAA and a .929 save percentage. He was named to the 2009 OHL All-Star Classic along with new teammates Cody Hodgson, Matt Duchene and Evgeny Grachev. McCollum put up a 13-8 record with a 2.90 GAA and a .898 save percentage in the playoffs, as Brampton lost to the Windsor Spitfires in the J. Ross Robertson Cup finals.

=== Professional ===
The Detroit Red Wings had McCollum split the 2009–10 season between the Toledo Walleye of the ECHL, and the Grand Rapids Griffins of the AHL. In six games with Toledo, McCollum had a 2-1-0 record with a 4.48 GAA and a save percentage of .864. With the Griffins, McCollum appeared in 30 games, as he had a 10-16-2 record with a 3.48 GAA and a .881 save percentage.

On March 28, 2011, after injuries to Red Wings goalies Chris Osgood and Jimmy Howard, McCollum was called up from Toledo to serve as Detroit's backup. He was in uniform for Detroit's game that night against Chicago. He made his NHL debut against the St. Louis Blues on March 30, 2011, replacing starting goaltender Joey MacDonald midway through the second period with the score 5-2 to the Blues. McCollum conceded 3 goals on 8 shots and was himself pulled at the end of the second period. Detroit went on to lose the game 10-3.

On July 22, 2013, McCollum signed a one-year AHL contract with the Grand Rapids Griffins. During the 2013–14 season, McCollum posted a 24–12–4 record with a 2.30 GAA, a .922 save percentage and two shutouts in 46 games. After five AHL seasons, McCollum ranks third all time among Griffins goaltenders, trailing Joey MacDonald and Jimmy Howard in games played (159) and wins (69).

On July 11, 2014, McCollum signed a one-year, two-way contract with the Detroit Red Wings. On January 11, 2015, McCollum was recalled by the Detroit Red Wings. Prior to being recalled, McCollum posted a 10–8–3 record with a 2.33 GAA and a .911 save percentage in 21 games for the Grand Rapids Griffins. McCollum made his first appearance of the season for the Red Wings on January 18, in a relief appearance for Petr Mrázek, after Mrázek allowed three goals on six shots in the first period to the Buffalo Sabres. The Red Wings rallied to score four unanswered goals, and won the game by a final of 6–4, to earn McCollum his first career NHL win. On February 4, 2015, McCollum was assigned to the Grand Rapids Griffins, after appearing in two games for the Red Wings this season, where he posted a 0.91 goals-against average, and 0.960 save percentage. During the 2014–15 season, McCollum, appeared in 37 games for the Griffins, posting a 19–11–7 record, a 2.40 GAA and a .916 save percentage.

During the 2015 Calder Cup playoffs McCollum became the first Griffins goalie to win five consecutive home playoff games, while tying Marc Lamothe's postseason record of five consecutive victories overall set in 2003.

McCollum was awarded the IOA/American Specialty AHL Man of the Year award for his outstanding contributions to the Grand Rapids community during the 2014–15 season.

On July 1, 2015, McCollum signed a one-year contract extension with the Red Wings. On January 15, 2016, McCollum was assigned to the Toledo Walleye for conditioning. McCollum has played in 10 games with the Griffins this season, posting a 4–6–0 record, a 2.53 GAA and a .924 save percentage. He was injured on December 5, 2015, while earning his fourth straight win with a 4–1 decision over the Lake Erie Monsters.

After the 2015–16 season, McCollum ended his seven-year association with the Red Wings. Leaving as a free agent and later accepted a professional try-out contract to attend the Los Angeles Kings training camp on August 16, 2016. After his release from the Kings, on October 15, 2016, McCollum secured an NHL contract by signing a two-year, two-way contract with the Calgary Flames. Assigned to AHL affiliate, the Stockton Heat, McCollum as the third choice option, appeared in just a single game with the Heat in November before he was reassigned to feature in 5 games with ECHL affiliate, the Adirondack Thunder. On March 8, 2017, McCollum was loaned by the Flames to fellow AHL club, the Charlotte Checkers for the remainder of the season.

On July 1, 2017, McCollum was traded back to the Detroit Red Wings in exchange for a conditional 7th round draft pick in the 2018 NHL entry draft. In the 2017–18 season, McCollum re-united with the Griffins and appeared in 37 games posting a 20-14-3 record.

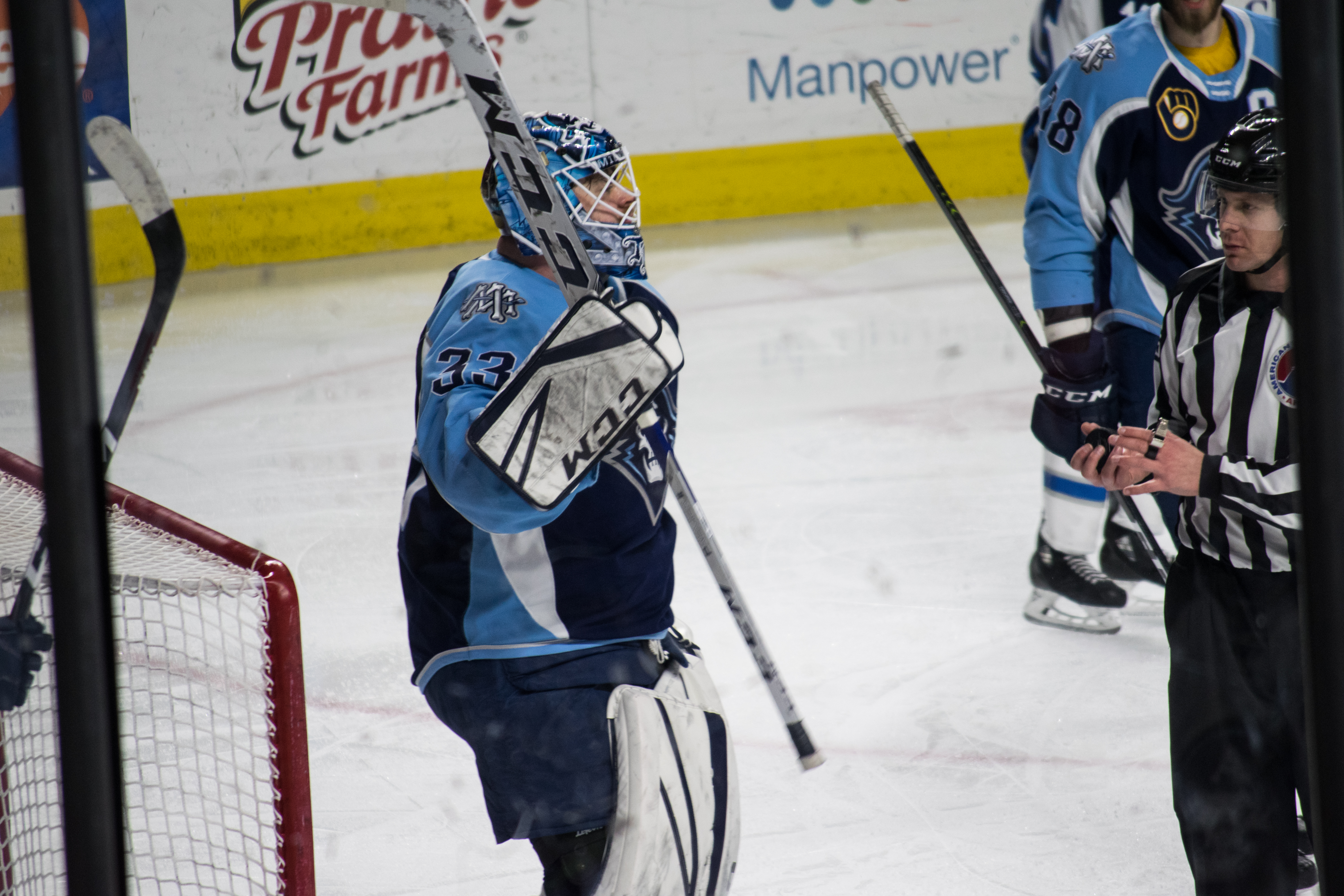
McCollum with the Milwaukee Admirals in 2019

As a free agent from the Red Wings, McCollum departed the club for a second time in agreeing to a one-year AHL contract with the Milwaukee Admirals, affiliate to the Nashville Predators, on July 17, 2018. On February 19, 2019, McCollum signed a one-year, two-way contract with the Nashville Predators.

As a free agent and leaving the Predators organization, McCollum agreed to a one-year AHL contract to add depth to the Hartford Wolf Pack, affiliate to the New York Rangers, on July 1, 2019. In the 2019–20 season, McCollum appeared in 7 games for the Wolf Pack posting a 2-2-2 record with a 2.37 goals-against average. He was assigned to split time in the ECHL, appearing in 11 games with the Maine Mariners and 3 games for the Florida Everblades. On February 20, 2020, McCollum was traded by the Wolf Pack along with Lewis Zerter-Gossage to the Lehigh Valley Phantoms in considerations of an NHL trade between the Rangers and the Philadelphia Flyers for goaltender Jean-François Bérubé. He was assigned by the Phantoms to join his third ECHL club for the season, the Reading Royals.

As a free agent, McCollum opted to pursue a career in Europe, agreeing to a one-year deal with Austrian club, HC TWK Innsbruck of the ICE Hockey League on August 17, 2020.

On 10 June 2024 it was announced that McCollum had signed with the UK's Belfast Giants of the Elite Ice Hockey League.

== International play ==
McCollum represented the United States at the 2009 World Junior Championships, finishing in fifth place. McCollum took the selection as a great honour.

== Personal ==
McCollum assists in goaltending camps near his hometown in Western New York. McCollum also plays pro Roller Hockey in the summer.

== Career statistics ==
			Regular season									Playoffs
Season	Team	League	GP	W	L	T/OT	MIN	GA	SO	GAA	SV%	GP	W	L	MIN	GA	SO	GAA	SV%
2006–07	Guelph Storm	OHL	55	26	18	10	3,158	126	5	2.39	.918	4	0	4	233	17	0	4.37	.890
2007–08	Guelph Storm	OHL	51	25	17	6	2,978	124	4	2.50	.914	10	5	5	596	19	1	1.91	.937
2008–09	Guelph Storm	OHL	31	17	10	4	1,859	69	3	2.23	.926	—	—	—	—	—	—	—	—
2008–09	Brampton Battalion	OHL	23	17	6	0	1,333	43	4	1.94	.929	21	13	8	1,284	62	1	2.90	.898
2009–10	Toledo Walleye	ECHL	6	2	1	0	188	14	0	4.48	.864	—	—	—	—	—	—	—	—
2009–10	Grand Rapids Griffins	AHL	30	10	16	2	1,741	101	0	3.48	.884	—	—	—	—	—	—	—	—
2010–11	Toledo Walleye	ECHL	23	11	9	2	1,305	60	3	2.76	.909	—	—	—	—	—	—	—	—
2010–11	Grand Rapids Griffins	AHL	22	6	12	2	1,152	64	1	3.33	.879	—	—	—	—	—	—	—	—
2010–11	Detroit Red Wings	NHL	1	0	0	0	15	3	0	12.00	.625	—	—	—	—	—	—	—	—
2011–12	Grand Rapids Griffins	AHL	28	11	16	0	1,580	92	0	3.49	.891	—	—	—	—	—	—	—	—
2011–12	Toledo Walleye	ECHL	15	6	6	2	870	38	0	2.62	.909	—	—	—	—	—	—	—	—
2012–13	Grand Rapids Griffins	AHL	31	18	11	2	1,846	81	2	2.63	.904	—	—	—	—	—	—	—	—
2013–14	Grand Rapids Griffins	AHL	46	24	12	4	2,561	98	2	2.30	.922	1	0	0	34	2	0	3.50	.875
2014–15	Grand Rapids Griffins	AHL	37	19	11	1	2,171	87	1	2.40	.916	15	9	6	894	38	0	2.55	.916
2014–15	Detroit Red Wings	NHL	2	1	0	0	66	1	0	0.91	.960	—	—	—	—	—	—	—	—
2015–16	Grand Rapids Griffins	AHL	30	15	13	0	1,686	68	1	2.42	.923	7	3	3	401	16	0	2.39	.919
2015–16	Toledo Walleye	ECHL	1	1	0	0	60	3	0	3.00	.893	—	—	—	—	—	—	—	—
2016–17	Adirondack Thunder	ECHL	5	3	1	1	303	15	0	2.97	.894	—	—	—	—	—	—	—	—
2016–17	Stockton Heat	AHL	1	1	0	0	40	1	0	1.50	.950	—	—	—	—	—	—	—	—
2016–17	Charlotte Checkers	AHL	17	11	2	4	1,030	36	1	2.10	.926	5	2	2	251	12	1	2.87	.910
2017–18	Grand Rapids Griffins	AHL	37	20	14	3	2,163	95	1	2.64	.912	3	1	1	140	7	0	3.00	.891
2018–19	Milwaukee Admirals	AHL	34	12	10	10	1,965	89	2	2.72	.899	1	0	0	29	3	0	6.29	.813
2019–20	Maine Mariners	ECHL	11	5	5	0	599	37	0	3.71	.886	—	—	—	—	—	—	—	—
2019–20	Florida Everblades	ECHL	3	3	0	0	182	5	1	1.65	.938	—	—	—	—	—	—	—	—
2019–20	Hartford Wolf Pack	AHL	7	2	2	2	380	15	0	2.37	.906	—	—	—	—	—	—	—	—
2019–20	Reading Royals	ECHL	6	4	2	0	355	10	1	1.69	.934	—	—	—	—	—	—	—	—
2020–21	HC TWK Innsbruck	ICEHL	37	17	15	4	2095	118	0	3.38	.894	—	—	—	—	—	—	—	—
2021–22	HC TWK Innsbruck	ICEHL	39	20	18	1	2290	114	0	2.99	.901	—	—	—	—	—	—	—	—
2021–22	Bietigheim Steelers	DEL	10	3	6	0	526	29	0	3.31	.901	—	—	—	—	—	—	—	—
2022–23	HC TWK Innsbruck	ICEHL	39	24	14	0	2248	115	0	3.07	.901	4	1	3	249	14	0	3.37	.884
2023–24	Eisbären Regensburg	DEL2	41	25	15	0	2424	103	3	2.55	.923	19	12	7	1121	45	0	2.41	.921
NHL totals			3	1	0	0	81	4	0	2.98	.879	—	—	—	—	—	—	—	—

Awards and achievements
Preceded by Brendan Smith	Detroit Red Wings first-round draft pick 2008	Succeeded by Riley Sheahan
