= Jeff Hoggan =

Canadian ice hockey player (born 1978)

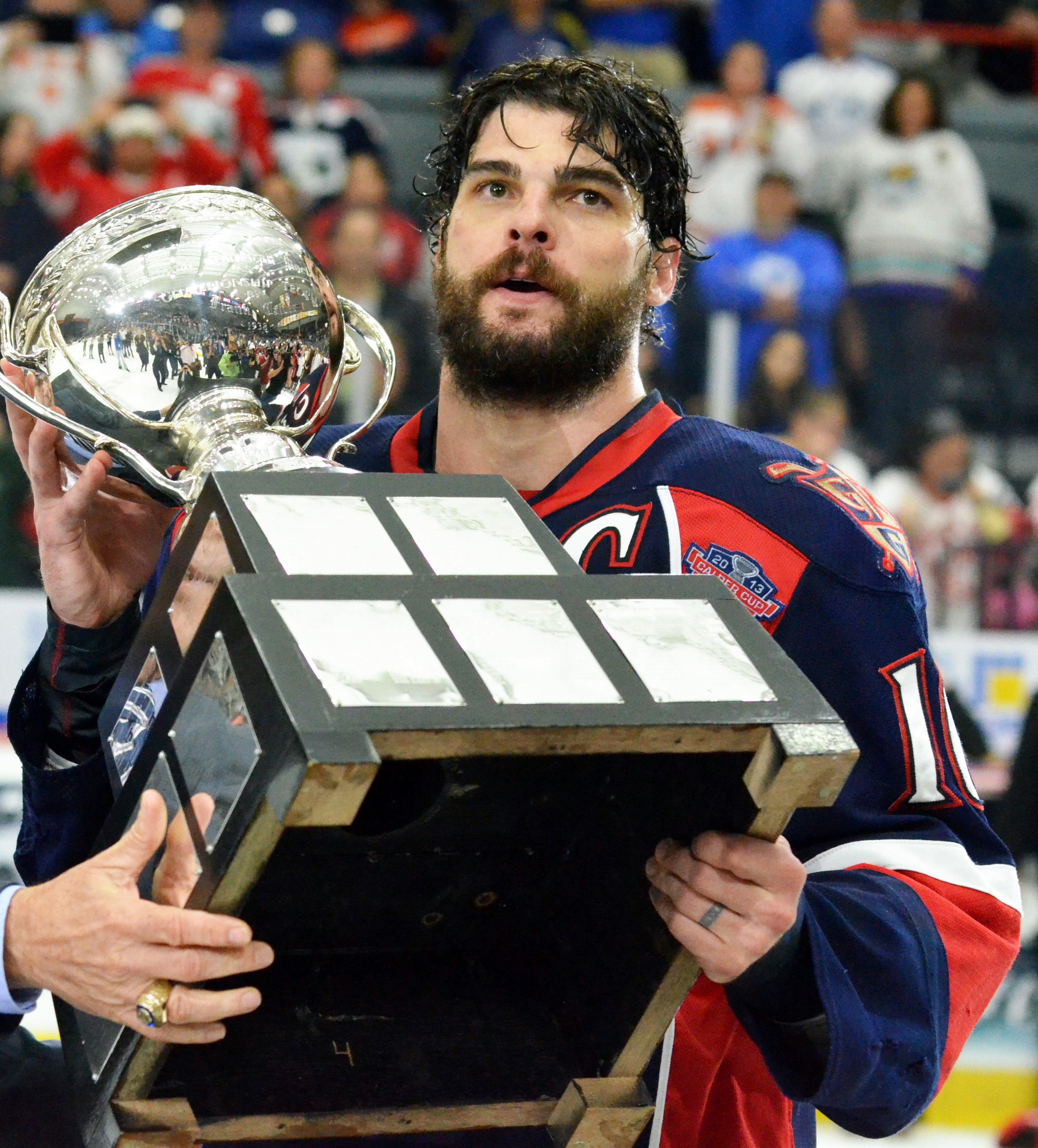
- Hoggan with the Calder Cup in 2013
- Born: February 1, 1978 (age 48) Hope, British Columbia, Canada
- Height: 6 ft 1 in (185 cm)
- Weight: 193 lb (88 kg; 13 st 11 lb)
- Position: Left wing
- Shot: Left
- Played for: St. Louis Blues; Boston Bruins; Phoenix Coyotes; EHC Wolfsburg; Hannover Scorpions
- NHL draft: Undrafted
- Playing career: 2002–2017

Jeffrey Allan Hoggan (born February 1, 1978) is a Canadian former professional ice hockey forward who played in the National Hockey League (NHL).

== Playing career ==
Although born in Hope, Hoggan spent much of his minor hockey career in the Chilliwack Minor Hockey Association before joining the Powell River Kings of the BCHL. Undrafted, Hoggan attended the University of Nebraska-Omaha and played through three years of eligibility with the Mavericks in the Central Collegiate Hockey Association.

He signed a contract in 2005 with the St. Louis Blues. In July 2006, he signed with the Boston Bruins as a free agent.

On July 29, 2010, Hoggan left North America as a free agent and signed with German team Grizzlys Wolfsburg of the DEL to a one-year contract. After helping Wolfsburg to the finals with 11 goals and 21 points in 38 games in the 2010–11 season, Hoggan signed with fellow German team, the Hannover Scorpions, to a one-year contract with an optional second year on June 14, 2011.

On October 9, 2012, Hoggan signed a one-year AHL contract with the Grand Rapids Griffins for the 2012–13 AHL season. Hoggan won the Calder Cup with the Griffins in 2013. On July 9, 2013, Hoggan re-signed a two-year AHL contract with the Grand Rapids Griffins through the 2014–15 AHL season.

On July 6, 2015, Hoggan signed a one-year contract with the Grand Rapids Griffins. Hoggan was named playing captain for the 2016 Toyota AHL All-Star Classic. Hoggan, who made his first AHL all-star appearance, became the third Griffin to be chosen as a playing captain for an AHL All-Star Classic, joining Kip Miller (2007) and Travis Richards (2004)

At the conclusion of the 2015–16 season, Hoggan was not offered a contract by the Griffins and became an unrestricted free agent. After joining the Iowa Wild on a professional try-out contract, the Wild signed Hoggan to a standard player contract for the remainder of the 2016–17 season. In 61 games with the Wild, Hoggan contributed with 7 goals and 12 points, ending his professional career at the conclusion of the regular season after 16 professional seasons.

== Career statistics ==
			Regular season					Playoffs
Season	Team	League	GP	G	A	Pts	PIM	GP	G	A	Pts	PIM
1997–98	Powell River Kings	BCHL	59	38	34	72	85	—	—	—	—	—
1999–00	U. of Nebraska-Omaha	CCHA	34	16	9	25	82	—	—	—	—	—
2000–01	U. of Nebraska-Omaha	CCHA	42	12	17	29	78	—	—	—	—	—
2001–02	U. of Nebraska-Omaha	CCHA	41	24	21	45	92	—	—	—	—	—
2001–02	Houston Aeros	AHL	—	—	—	—	—	4	0	0	0	2
2002–03	Houston Aeros	AHL	65	6	5	11	45	14	1	2	3	23
2003–04	Houston Aeros	AHL	77	21	15	36	88	2	0	1	1	4
2004–05	Worcester IceCats	AHL	47	16	9	25	55	—	—	—	—	—
2005–06	St. Louis Blues	NHL	52	2	6	8	34	—	—	—	—	—
2006–07	Boston Bruins	NHL	46	0	2	2	33	—	—	—	—	—
2006–07	Providence Bruins	AHL	22	4	7	11	27	13	4	3	7	17
2007–08	Providence Bruins	AHL	71	29	31	60	59	5	3	4	7	4
2007–08	Boston Bruins	NHL	1	0	0	0	0	—	—	—	—	—
2008–09	San Antonio Rampage	AHL	60	22	13	35	64	—	—	—	—	—
2008–09	Phoenix Coyotes	NHL	4	0	1	1	7	—	—	—	—	—
2009–10	San Antonio Rampage	AHL	70	13	20	33	44	—	—	—	—	—
2009–10	Phoenix Coyotes	NHL	4	0	0	0	2	—	—	—	—	—
2010–11	Grizzly Adams Wolfsburg	DEL	38	11	10	21	63	2	0	0	0	2
2011–12	Hannover Scorpions	DEL	43	14	14	28	14	—	—	—	—	—
2012–13	Grand Rapids Griffins	AHL	76	20	25	45	31	24	5	7	12	14
2013–14	Grand Rapids Griffins	AHL	59	14	17	31	31	10	4	1	5	12
2014–15	Grand Rapids Griffins	AHL	76	14	17	31	23	16	2	7	9	26
2015–16	Grand Rapids Griffins	AHL	67	9	3	12	22	9	0	1	1	4
2016–17	Iowa Wild	AHL	61	7	5	12	33	—	—	—	—	—
NHL totals			107	2	9	11	76	—	—	—	—	—

== Awards and achievements ==
Award	Year
CCHA All-Tournament Team	2000
All-CCHA First Team	2001-02
AHCA West Second-Team All-American	2001–02
Fred T. Hunt Memorial Award	2014–15
