= Grand Rapids Griffins =

American Hockey League team in Grand Rapids, Michigan

- City: Grand Rapids, Michigan
- League: American Hockey League
- Conference: Western
- Division: Central
- Founded: 1996 (IHL)
- Home arena: Van Andel Arena
- Colors: Black, red, silver, white, gold
- Owner: Dan DeVos
- General manager: Shawn Horcoff
- Head coach: Dan Watson
- Captain: Dominik Shine
- Media: Bally Sports Detroit; NewsRadio WOOD 1300 AM/ 106.9 FM; AHL.TV (Internet) wxsp (local only)
- Affiliates: Detroit Red Wings (NHL); Toledo Walleye (ECHL)
- Website: www.griffinshockey.com

Franchise history
- 1996–present: Grand Rapids Griffins

Championships
- Regular season titles: 1 IHL (2000–01); 1 AHL (2005–06)
- Division titles: 2 IHL (1999–00, 2000–01); 6 AHL (2001–02, 2002–03, 2005–06, 2012–13, 2014–15, 2025–26)
- Conference titles: 1 IHL (1999–00); 2 AHL (2012–13, 2016–17)
- Calder Cups: 2 (2012–13, 2016–17)

The Grand Rapids Griffins are a professional ice hockey team based in Grand Rapids, Michigan. They compete in the American Hockey League (AHL), playing their home games at Van Andel Arena. They are the top farm team for the Detroit Red Wings of the National Hockey League, and are the 2013 and 2017 Calder Cup champions.

The franchise began in the now-defunct International Hockey League in 1996 and merged into the AHL in 2001. Three players have since had their numbers retired.

== Franchise history ==
=== The return of professional hockey to Grand Rapids ===
The team was the third International Hockey League (IHL) franchise in Grand Rapids, following the Grand Rapids Rockets of the 1950s and the Grand Rapids Owls of the late 1970s, and owed its existence to the construction of a new arena in the downtown area, what became Van Andel Arena. Following the project's authorization, Amway executives Dave Van Andel and Dan DeVos formed West Michigan Hockey, Inc., in January 1995 with the intent of securing a minor league hockey franchise. The group promptly began discussions with the IHL, American Hockey League (AHL) and East Coast Hockey League (ECHL) to gauge interest in the Grand Rapids market. Also that month, Bruce Saurs, owner of the IHL's Peoria Rivermen, visited Grand Rapids to discuss with the group potential relocation of his team. In April, however, the IHL's board of directors voted to waive one of its expansion criteria – that the city's metropolitan area comprise at least one million people – and grant West Michigan Hockey a franchise for US$7 million. The league ultimately was swayed by the community's response, which included over 8,000 season ticket requests, and the new, fully financed arena.

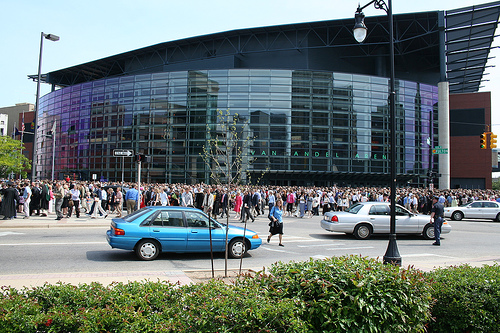
The construction of Van Andel Arena paved the way for professional hockey's return to Grand Rapids.

At the announcement of a "name the team" contest in June 1995, DeVos hinted that the group was looking for something "with a face ... with a personality, that we can translate into a mascot of some sort". "Grand Rapids Griffins" was chosen as the winning entry, and the logo (showing not a griffin, but an animal more similar to an opinicus) and colors of the hockey club were unveiled in November. The logo was designed by Sean Michael Edwards Design, Inc., a New York firm whose portfolio includes logos for the Florida Panthers and Seattle Mariners. navy blue and gold were chosen as the primary colors, along with hunter green, red and silver accents. This aligned with the traditional image DeVos sought for the new team. "We didn't want to be trendy in any way", DeVos said.

Original Griffins logo, used from 1996 until 2015

In January 1996, Bob McNamara, former IHL goaltender and assistant general manager of the Cleveland Lumberjacks, was appointed general manager of the Griffins. His first move was to hire Dave Allison, who had briefly coached the Ottawa Senators that season, as head coach. Among the first players to join the team were defensemen Todd Nelson and Travis Richards and goaltender Pokey Reddick, all of whom brought National Hockey League (NHL) experience. On the business side, the Griffins secured a deal with WOOD-AM to broadcast all regular season and playoff games in their inaugural season. Rich Kincaide then left his sportscaster position at WJR in Detroit to become the Griffins' play-by-play announcer and director of communications. The team also signed agreements with WZZM and WWMT to televise a handful of games each. Following lengthy negotiations with the City of Grand Rapids, a DeVos-owned company took over operations of Belknap Ice Arena (now known as Griff's Ice House), which was then renovated for use as the Griffins' practice facility.

=== Independent years (1996–99) ===
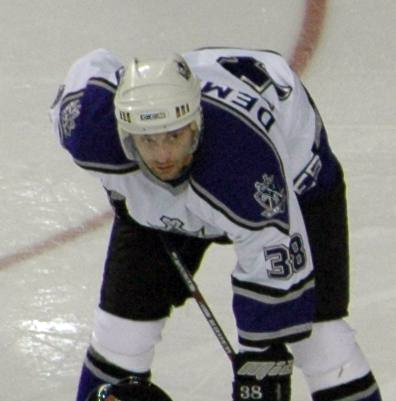
Grand Rapids was Pavol Demitra's last minor league stop before establishing himself in the NHL.

McNamara filled the Griffins' 1996–97 inaugural season roster with IHL and AHL veterans (notably Michel Picard, Jeff Nelson and Don McSween) and a handful of prospects. He also signed affiliation agreements with the Muskegon Fury of the Colonial Hockey League (CHL) and the Mississippi Sea Wolves of the ECHL. The Griffins won their inaugural game on the road against the Indianapolis Ice, but lost the home opener to the Orlando Solar Bears six days later. An early-season record of 9–10–2 improved after the addition of Pavol Demitra, who was acquired in a trade with the Las Vegas Thunder in late November, and NHL veteran Danton Cole, who signed with the team after a stint in the German Ice Hockey League (DEL). The Griffins were paced by the top forward line of Picard, Jeff Nelson and Demitra; all three averaged over one point per game during the regular season. Demitra left the Griffins in March 1997 after signing a contract with the St. Louis Blues, and scored over 300 goals in sixteen NHL seasons. He was replaced on the first line by rookie Kevyn Adams, who went on to play in ten NHL seasons. Grand Rapids finished in last place in a strong Northeast Division with a record of 40–30–12; the team's opening round playoff series with Orlando ended in a 3–2 loss. Picard was voted a first-team all star by the league's coaches after finishing fourth in league scoring with 46 goals and 55 assists in 82 games. The franchise's first season was considered a success by the IHL, which held its 1997 All-Star Game in front of a capacity crowd at the 10,834-seat Van Andel Arena. Thirty-nine of forty-one home games were also sellouts, and the Griffins set an IHL record with season ticket sales capped at 7,000.

Before the 1997–98 season, the Griffins selected Glen Metropolit and two other players in the IHL expansion draft – postponed a year due to extended labor negotiations between the league and its players – signed NHL journeymen forwards Mark Greig and Ed Patterson, and re-signed Michel Picard. Most of the previous season's defensive core also returned, though Don McSween was traded following Kerry Huffman's signing early in the season. Goaltender Pokey Reddick requested and was granted a trade after splitting playing time with Ian Gordon early in the season; Patrick Lalime signed with the team shortly thereafter. By December, the Griffins were contending for first place in the Northeast Division, largely on the strength of their goaltending and the top forward line of Picard, Metropolit and Greig. Picard was recalled by the St. Louis Blues in January for fifteen games; Chris Lindberg signed with the team shortly after Picard's recall, but was later suspended by the IHL after bolting to play for Swiss team EV Zug. The Griffins' record fell to 30–25–7 by March, and disagreements over what changes needed to be made prompted McNamara to fire head coach Dave Allison. McNamara assumed the coaching duties for the final twenty games of the regular season, as well as the playoffs, in which the Griffins were swept in the first round by the Cincinnati Cyclones. Picard, with 28 goals and 41 assists in 58 games, again led the team in scoring, though another recall to the Blues left him unavailable for the playoffs.

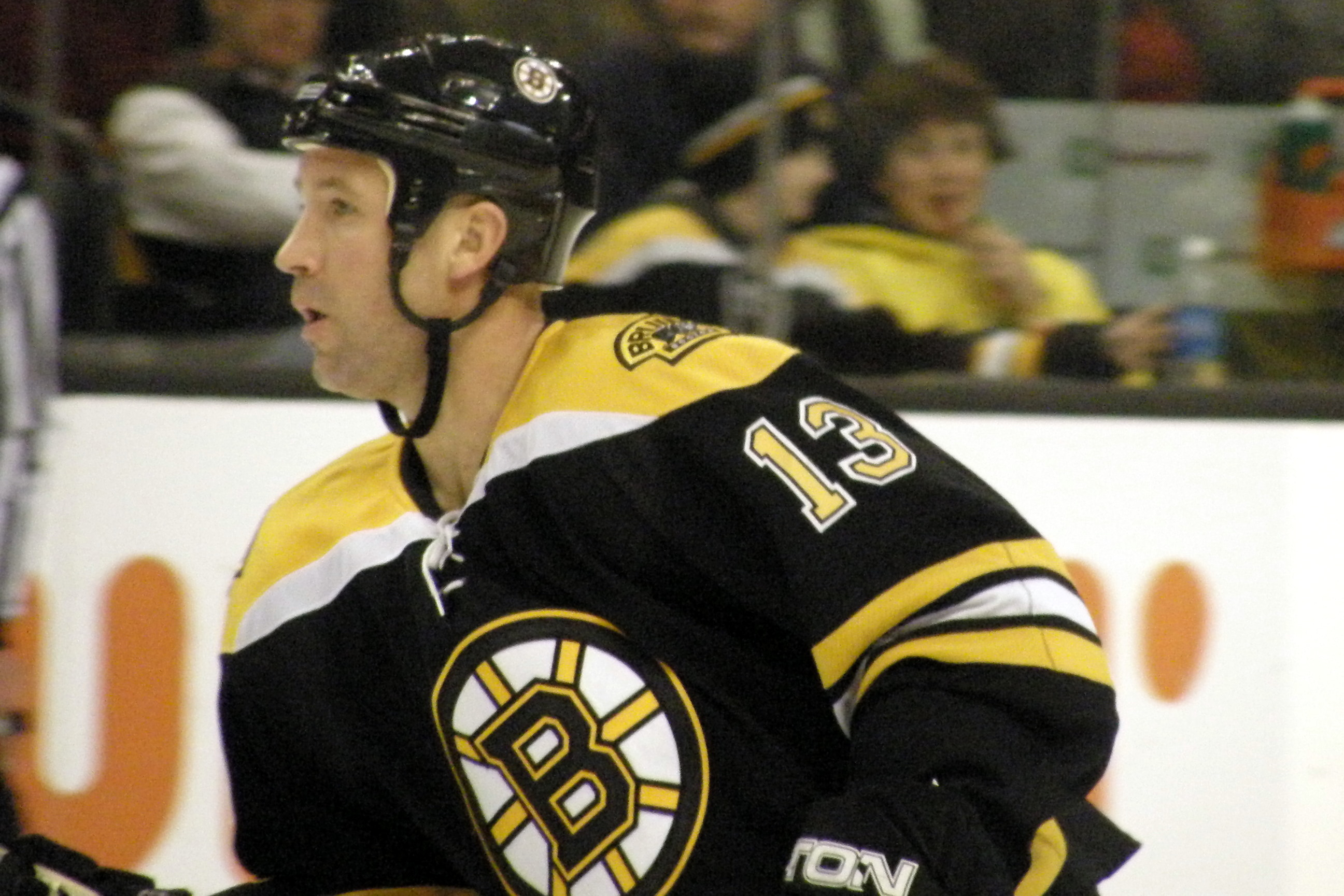
Glen Metropolit led the Griffins in scoring for the 1998–1999 IHL season. He played in over 400 NHL games with seven teams.

In July 1998, Guy Charron was introduced as the Griffins' new head coach; his previous seventeen years of coaching experience included five years as an assistant coach with the Calgary Flames of the NHL. His new team endured a flurry of roster moves following the departure of Mark Greig, Patrick Lalime and Shane Hnidy, all of whom signed NHL contracts. Kip Miller signed with the Griffins in August but left the team before playing in a regular season game, instead earning an NHL roster spot after his rights were traded to the Pittsburgh Penguins. Key additions who stuck with the team included forward Robert Petrovicky and Darren Rumble. Early-season signees Joe Frederick and Andrei Vasilyev provided an offensive boost, but injuries on the defensive side preceded a franchise-record seven-game losing streak in November, leaving the Griffins with the worst record in the IHL at that point. Among the few bright spots for the team was the play of linemates Metropolit, who scored the franchise's first ever natural hat trick that season, and Petrovicky, who was named the IHL's Player of the Month for November after scoring five goals and 12 assists in 12 games. Petrovicky signed an NHL contract with the Tampa Bay Lightning in February, and the Griffins made numerous roster moves in the following weeks in an effort to qualify for the playoffs. The team finished with the second worst record in the 1998–99 IHL season, and failed to earn a playoff spot. (The IHL, down to 16 teams that year, had adopted a 12-team playoff format.) Metropolit's 81 points led the team and placed him ninth in league scoring; he went on to play in eight NHL seasons.

=== Ottawa Senators affiliation and joining the AHL (1999–2002) ===
Late in the 1998–99 season, general manager Bob McNamara on numerous occasions discussed an affiliation agreement with Rick Dudley, the first-year general manager of the Ottawa Senators. Dudley considered other franchises, and left the Senators before a deal was in place, but his replacement, Marshall Johnston, ultimately chose Grand Rapids. The two-year agreement called for the assignment of twelve Senators prospects to the Griffins each year. "[T]he most significant reason we've pursued this is because we want to win a championship", said McNamara. Griffins co-owner Dan DeVos echoed that sentiment: "This decision was not based on a financial analysis. Our intent was to improve our record."

In June 2001, the IHL ceased operations. The Griffins were among six IHL teams admitted to the American Hockey League (AHL) for the following season. Because the AHL did not allow owners to control multiple teams (unlike the IHL), the DeVos family's other IHL teams (the Orlando Solar Bears and Kansas City Blades) were forced to fold.

=== Detroit Red Wings affiliation (2002–present) ===
On January 24, 2002, the Griffins and Detroit Red Wings held a joint press conference at The B.O.B. in downtown Grand Rapids to announce a five-year affiliation agreement (2002–03 to 2006–07). Red Wings general manager Ken Holland and assistant GM Jim Nill were present for the announcement, which was made before an overflow crowd of media and sponsors. Terms of the affiliation called for the Red Wings to supply a minimum of thirteen players to the Griffins each season. Since then, Red Wings prospects and draft picks have made up a majority of the Griffins' roster.

Located in-state only two hours from Detroit along Interstate 96, the Griffins gave the Red Wings what they had sought after for years—a local AHL affiliate. The previous affiliate, the Adirondack Red Wings, despite a relatively successful run in the AHL (four Calder Cups) were located over 650 miles from Detroit. This was too far away for the preferences of Red Wings management, as it made back-and-forth player assignments difficult. For this reason, the NHL Red Wings suspended the AHL Red Wings franchise with the intent of moving it to Toledo, Ohio, just a short distance from Detroit. These plans never materialized, so that AHL franchise stayed dormant for three years until being sold and reactivated as the San Antonio Rampage. Since 1991–92 (with the exception of the 2000 and 2007–08 and 2008–09), Detroit has had an ECHL affiliate, who have been very successful, in Toledo, named the Storm and later the Walleye that have been able to feed players into Grand Rapids, with some of them making it up to the NHL and even Detroit. For their part, the Griffins have been keen to push their ties to the Red Wings, branding as "Hockeytown West."

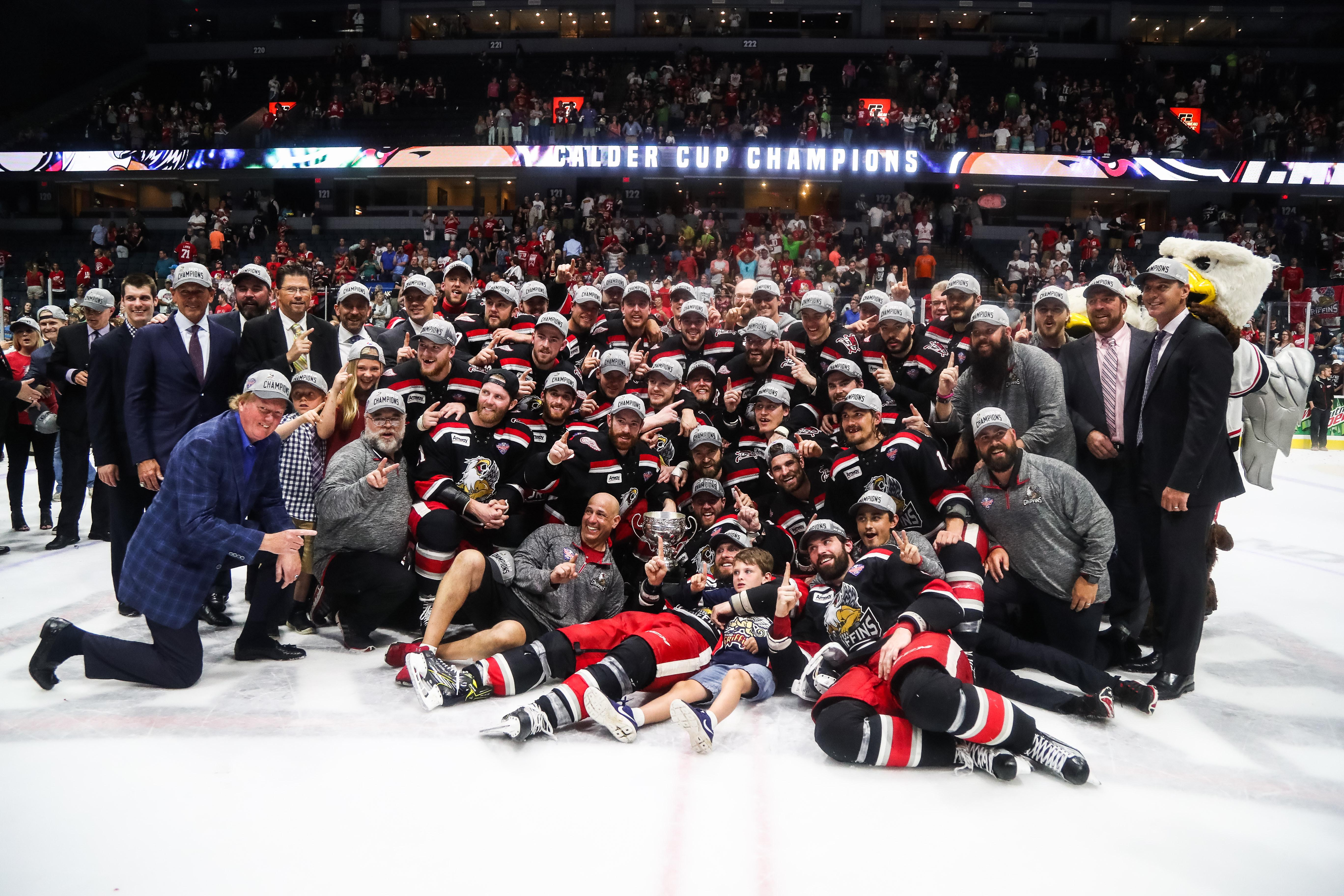
Griffins celebrate winning the 2017 Calder Cup

On April 5, 2002, with a 3–2 victory at Chicago, the Griffins won the AHL's inaugural Bud Poile Trophy as the 2001–02 West Division champions. On March 9, 2003, thanks to losses by Rochester and Cincinnati, the Griffins won the John Chick Trophy as the 2002–03 Central Division champions. The title marked their second straight as AHL members. On April 14, 2007, the Griffins and Detroit Red Wings announced an agreement in principle to extend their affiliation through the 2011–12 season. On June 4, 2008, nine former Griffins won the Stanley Cup as part of the 2007–08 Detroit Red Wings.

After the 2010–11 season, general manager Bob McNamara, the only hockey operations chief in franchise history, retired. Initially, the Griffins opted to forgo having a general manager, instead relying on the Red Wings for hockey operations support. However, in early 2012, Red Wings assistant general manager Ryan Martin was named general manager of the Griffins as well.

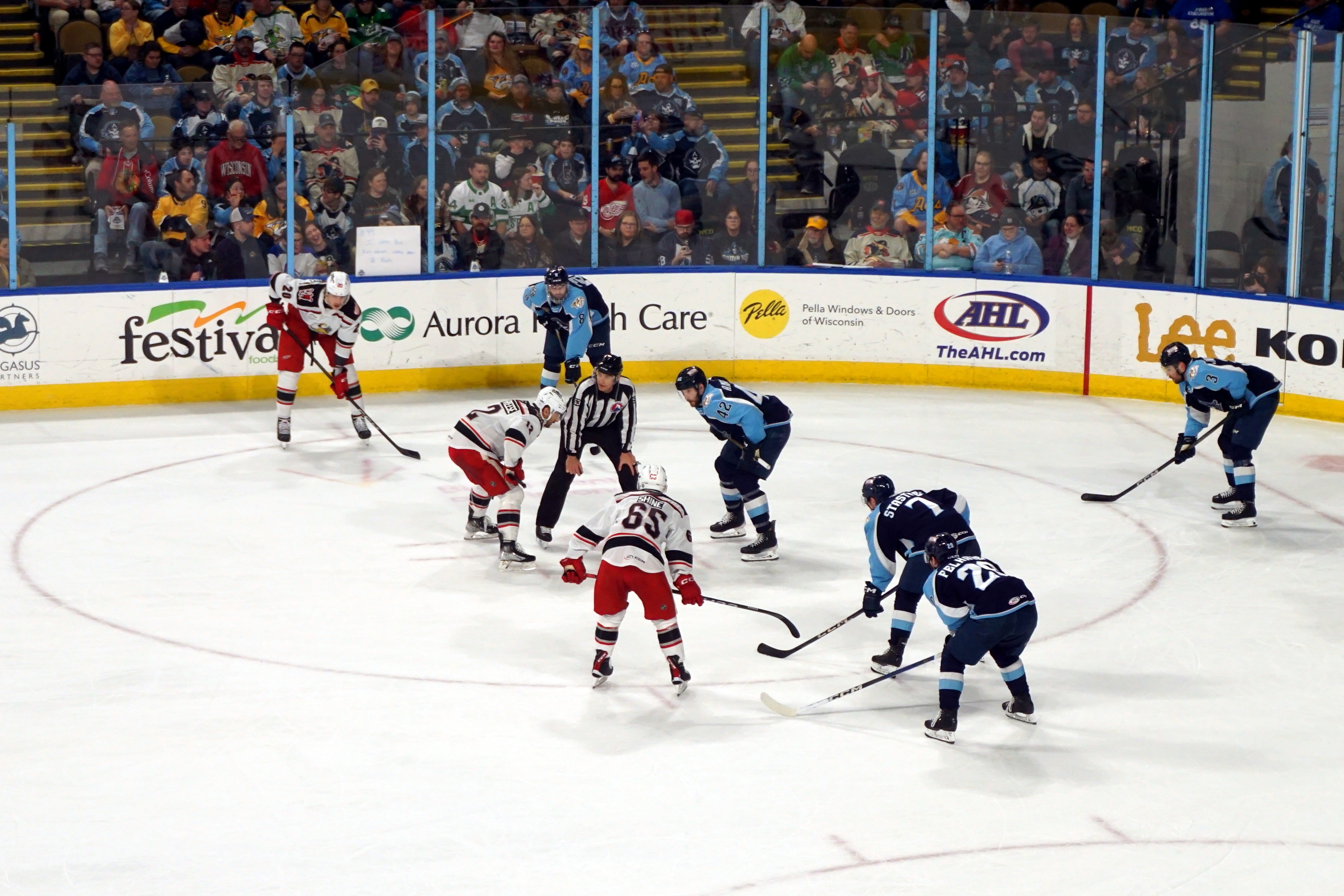
The Griffins in action against the Milwaukee Admirals

On March 7, 2012, the Griffins and Detroit Red Wings announced a five-year affiliation agreement extension through the 2016–17 season. On June 13, 2013, the Griffins won the Calder Cup for the first time in franchise history, defeating the Syracuse Crunch in six games. On June 16, 2015, Todd Nelson was named head coach of the Griffins. On June 13, 2017, the Griffins won the 2017 Calder Cup, defeating the Syracuse Crunch in six games in a repeat of the 2013 finals. This time they won it on home ice in front of a sell out crowd at Van Andel Arena—the first time that a Grand Rapids-based team had won a title on home ice. Tyler Bertuzzi was named MVP and received the Jack A. Butterfield Trophy. On July 6, 2017, the Griffins and Detroit Red Wings announced a five-year affiliation agreement extension through the 2021–22 season. After three seasons and one Calder Cup, head coach Todd Nelson was hired as an assistant with the Dallas Stars in the NHL and was replaced by assistant Ben Simon for the 2018–19 season. On July 25, 2022, the Griffins and Detroit Red Wings announced another five-year extension of their affiliation agreement through the 2026–27 season. On June 14, 2023, Dan Watson was named head coach of the Griffins.

== Season-by-season results ==
This is a partial list of the last five seasons completed by the Griffins. For the full season-by-season history, see List of Grand Rapids Griffins seasons

Regular season											Playoffs					
Season	Games	Won	Lost	OTL	SOL	Points	PCT	Goals for	Goals against	Standing	Year	Prelims	1st round	2nd round	3rd round	Finals
2021–22	76	33	35	6	2	74	.487	209	240	7th, Central	2022	Did not qualify				
2022–23	72	28	36	4	4	64	.444	194	255	7th, Central	2023	Did not qualify				
2023–24	72	37	23	8	4	86	.597	208	202	2nd, Central	2024	BYE	W, 3–1, RCK	L, 2–3, MIL	—	—
2024–25	72	37	29	4	2	80	.556	202	203	3rd, Central	2025	BYE	L, 0–3, TEX	—	—	—
2025–26	72	51	16	4	1	107	.743	255	159	1st, Central	2026	BYE	W, 3–1, MB	L, 1–3, CHI	—	—

== Players ==
=== Current roster ===
Updated October 30, 2026.

No.	Nat	Player	Pos	S/G	Age	Acquired	Birthplace	Contract
3	(United States)	Ronnie Attard	D	R	27	2026	White Lake Township, Michigan	Red Wings
30	(United States)	Trey Augustine	G	L	21	2026	South Lyon, Michigan	Red Wings
11	(Canada)	Carter Bear	LW	L	19	2026	Winnipeg, Manitoba	Red Wings
25	(Czech Republic)	Ondrej Becher	C	L	22	2024	Ostrava, Czech Republic	Red Wings
78	(Canada)	Jacob Bryson	D	L	28	2026	London, Ontario	Red Wings
8	(United States)	Shai Buium	D	L	23	2024	San Diego, California	Red Wings
42	(Canada)	Cameron Butler	RW	R	24	2026	Ottawa, Ontario	Red Wings
83	(Canada)	Justice Christensen	D	R	21	2026	Red Deer, Alberta	Griffins
70	(Sweden)	Noah Dower Nilsson	LW	L	21	2026	Strömstad, Sweden	Red Wings
33	(United States)	Kienan Draper	RW	R	24	2026	Royal Oak, Michigan	Griffins
26	(Canada)	Dylan James	LW	L	23	2026	Calgary, Alberta	Red Wings
41	(Canada)	Alex Kannok-Leipert	D	R	26	2025	Nakhon Ratchasima, Thailand	Griffins
92	(Finland)	Jesse Kiiskinen	RW	R	21	2026	Hollola, Finland	Red Wings
37	(Sweden)	William Lagesson (A)	D	L	30	2024	Gothenburg, Sweden	Red Wings
19	(United States)	John Leonard	LW	L	28	2025	Westwood, New Jersey	Red Wings
82	(Canada)	Sutter Muzzatti	C	L	23	2026	Okemos, Michigan	Red Wings
35	(Czech Republic)	Michal Postava	G	L	24	2025	Valašské Meziříčí, Czech Republic	Red Wings
93	(Switzerland)	Theo Rochette	C	L	24	2026	Neuchâtel, Switzerland	Red Wings
44	(Sweden)	Axel Sandin-Pellikka	D	R	21	2025	Gällivare, Sweden	Red Wings
65	(United States)	Dominik Shine (C)	RW	R	33	2017	Pinckney, Michigan	Red Wings
32	(Sweden)	Wilmer Skoog	C	L	27	2026	Stockholm, Sweden	Red Wings
61	(Canada)	Chase Stillman	RW	R	23	2026	St. Louis, Missouri	Red Wings

=== Team captains ===
- Don McSween, 1996–97
- Kerry Huffman, 1997–98
- Danton Cole, 1998–99
- Ed Patterson, 1999–2001
- Travis Richards, 2001–04
- Blake Sloan, 2004–05
- Matt Ellis, 2005–07
- Garrett Stafford, Mark Cullen, Ryan Oulahen, 2007–08
- Darren Haydar, 2008–09
- Jamie Tardif, 2009–11
- Garnet Exelby, 2011–12
- Jeff Hoggan, 2012–16
- Nathan Paetsch, 2016–17
- Matthew Ford, 2017–2020
- Brian Lashoff, 2020–23
- Josiah Didier, 2023–25
- Dominik Shine, 2025–present

=== American Hockey League Hall of Famers ===
AHL Hall of Fame Honored Members
Name	Seasons	Induction Year
Alexandre Giroux	2001-02 (player)	2026
Darren Haydar	2008-09 (player)	2020
Bryan Helmer	2004-06 (player)	2017
Michel Picard	1996-2000, 2002-04 (player)	2025

=== Retired numbers ===
Grand Rapids Griffins retired numbers
No.	Player	Position	Career	No. retirement
7	Michel Picard	LW	1996–2000, 2002–2004	February 19, 2022
10	Jeff Hoggan	LW	2012–2016	April 2, 2022
24	Travis Richards	D	1996–2006	November 24, 2006

== Club records ==
Single season

- Most goals: Donald MacLean, 56, 2005–06
- Most assists: Jiri Hudler, 60, 2005–06
- Most points: Michel Picard, 101, 1996–97
- Most penalty minutes: Darryl Bootland, 390, 2005–06
- Most wins: Mike Fountain, 2000–01, and Joey MacDonald, 2004–05, 34
- Best goals against average: Martin Prusek, 1.83, 2001–02
- Best save percentage: Joey MacDonald, .936, 2003–04

Career

- Most goals: Michel Picard, 158
- Most assists: Michel Picard, 222
- Most points: Michel Picard, 380
- Most penalty minutes: Darryl Bootland, 1,164
- Most wins: Tom McCollum, 123
- Most shutouts: Joey MacDonald, 20
- Most games: Travis Richards, 655
