= 2015 Calder Cup playoffs =

North American ice hockey tournament

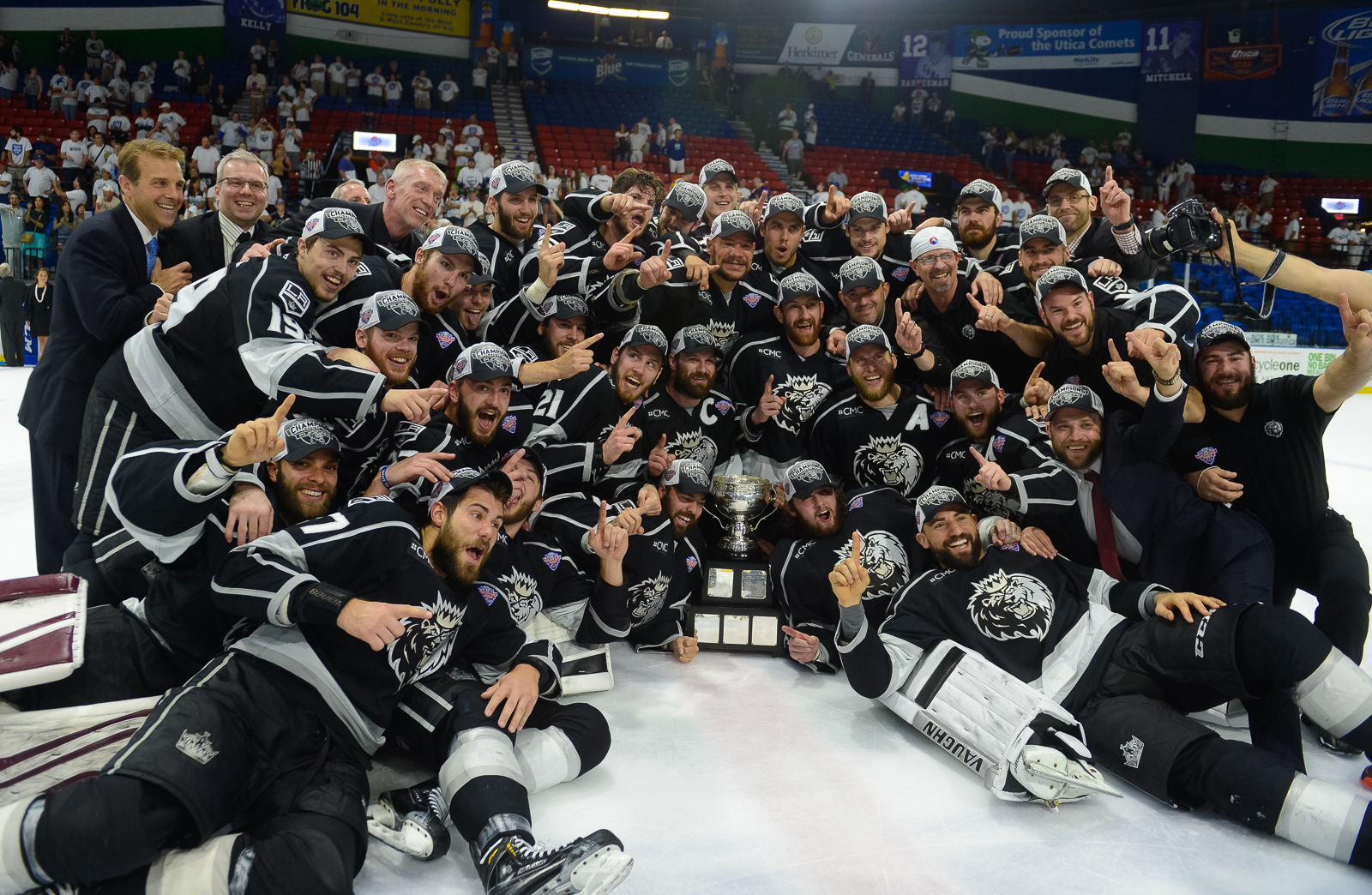
- The champion Manchester Monarchs

Tournament details
- Dates: April 22 – June 13, 2015
- Teams: 16

Final positions
- Champions: Manchester Monarchs
- Runners-up: Utica Comets

Tournament statistics
- Scoring leader(s): Michael Mersch (Monarchs) & Jordan Weal (Monarchs) (22 points)

Awards
- MVP: Jordan Weal (Monarchs)

The 2015 Calder Cup playoffs of the American Hockey League began on April 22, 2015, with the playoff format that was introduced in 2012. The sixteen teams that qualified, eight from each conference, will play best-of-five series in the conference quarterfinals, with the playoffs to continue with best-of-seven series for the conference semi-finals, conference finals, and Calder Cup finals. The Manchester Monarchs defeated the Utica Comets in five games to win the Calder Cup for the first time in franchise history, and the last prior to their relocation as the Ontario Reign.

== Playoff seeds ==
After the 2014–15 AHL regular season, 16 teams qualified for the playoffs. The top eight teams from each conference qualifies for the playoffs.

=== Eastern Conference ===
==== Atlantic Division ====
1. Manchester Monarchs – 109 points
2. Providence Bruins – 91 points
3. Worcester Sharks – 88 points
4. Portland Pirates – 87 points

==== Northeast Division ====
1. Hartford Wolf Pack – 95 points
2. Syracuse Crunch – 92 points

==== East Division ====
1. Hershey Bears – 100 points
2. Wilkes-Barre/Scranton Penguins – 97 points

=== Western Conference ===
==== West Division ====
1. San Antonio Rampage – 98 points
2. Texas Stars – 94 points
3. Oklahoma City Barons – 90 points

==== Midwest Division ====
1. Grand Rapids Griffins – 100 points
2. Rockford IceHogs – 99 points
3. Chicago Wolves – 87 points

==== North Division ====
1. Utica Comets – 103 points
2. Toronto Marlies – 89 points

== Bracket ==
Conference Quarterfinals	Conference Semifinals
1	Manchester	3
8	Portland	2
1	Manchester	4
4	W-B/Scranton	1
2	Hershey	3
7	Worcester	1
Eastern Conference
3	Hartford	3
6	Providence	2
2	Hershey	2
3	Hartford	4
4	W-B/Scranton	3
5	Syracuse	0
1	Utica	3
8	Chicago	2
1	Utica	4
6	Oklahoma City	3
2	Grand Rapids	3
7	Toronto	2
Western Conference
3	San Antonio	0
6	Oklahoma City	3
2	Grand Rapids	4
4	Rockford	1
4	Rockford	3
5	Texas	0

Conference Finals
1	Manchester	4
3	Hartford	0
1	Utica	4
2	Grand Rapids	2

Calder Cup Finals
E1	Manchester	4
W1	Utica	1

== Conference quarterfinals ==
Note 1: All times are in Eastern Time (UTC-4).
Note 2: Game times in italics signify games to be played only if necessary.
Note 3: Home team is listed first.

=== Eastern Conference ===
==== (1) Manchester Monarchs vs. (8) Portland Pirates ====
April 23	Manchester Monarchs	5 – 2	Portland Pirates	Verizon Wireless Arena	Recap
Jordan Weal (1) – 02:07; Brian O'Neill (1) – 10:27		First period	03:11 – pp – Henrik Samuelsson (1)
Jordan Weal (2) – pp – 11:27; Brian O'Neill (2) – 17:30		Second period	No scoring
Vincent LoVerde (1) – en, sh – 17:56		Third period	19:08 – pp – Jordan Szwarz (1)
Jean-Francois Berube 14 saves / 16 shots		Goalie stats	Mike McKenna 10 saves / 14 shots Louis Domingue 8 saves / 8 shots

April 25	Manchester Monarchs	6 – 2	Portland Pirates	Verizon Wireless Arena	Recap
Michael Mersch (1) – 0:20; Jordan Weal (3) – 0:30		First period	19:45 – Brendan Shinnimin (1)
No scoring		Second period	No scoring
Sean Backman (1) – pp – 1:53; Brian O'Neill (3) – 2:10; Nic Dowd (1) – 2:30; Michael Mersch (2) – en – 18:16		Third period	6:30 – pp – Philip Samuelsson (1)
Jean-Francois Berube 17 saves / 19 shots		Goalie stats	Mike McKenna 1 save / 3 shots Louis Domingue 23 saves / 26 shots

April 26	Portland Pirates	3 – 2	Manchester Monarchs	Cross Insurance Arena	Recap
Phil Lane (1) – 14:32		First period	19:34 – pp – Michael Mersch (3)
Eric Selleck (1) – 12:50		Second period	5:28 – Jordan Weal (4)
Francis Wathier (1) – 19:57		Third period	No scoring
Louis Domingue 31 saves / 33 shots		Goalie stats	Jean-Francois Berube 20 saves / 23 shots

April 30	Portland Pirates	5 – 0	Manchester Monarchs	Cross Insurance Arena	Recap
Francis Wathier (2) – 19:05		First period	No scoring
Brandon Gormley (1) – 08:59; Patrick McNeill (1) – pp – 13:11		Second period	No scoring
Francis Wathier (3) – 0:46; Brendan Perlini (1) – 18:41		Third period	No scoring
Louis Domingue 28 saves / 28 shots		Goalie stats	Jean-Francois Berube 14 saves / 19 shots

May 2	Manchester Monarchs	5 – 3	Portland Pirates	Verizon Wireless Arena	Recap
Michael Mersch (4) – 01:42; Ryan Horvat (1) – 16:34		First period	No scoring
Jordan Weal (5) – pp – 03:34		Second period	12:33 – pp – Henrik Samuelsson (2); 16:13 – pp – Tyler Gaudet (1); 19:59 – Brendan Shinnimin (2)
Michael Mersch (5) – 01:16; Adrian Kempe (1) – 01:36		Third period	No scoring
Jean-Francois Berube 24 saves / 27 shots		Goalie stats	Louis Domingue 33 saves / 38 shots

Manchester wins series 3–2

==== (2) Hershey Bears vs. (7) Worcester Sharks ====
April 24	Worcester Sharks	1 – 4	Hershey Bears	DCU Center	Recap
Micheal Haley (1) – pp – 19:46		First period	No scoring
No scoring		Second period	18:31 – Connor Carrick (1)
No scoring		Third period	17:39 – pp – Nate Schmidt (1); 19:03 – pp – Stanislav Galiev (1); 19:30 – en, pp – Chris Brown (1)
Aaron Dell 20 saves / 23 shots		Goalie stats	Pheonix Copley 41 saves / 42 shots

April 25	Worcester Sharks	1 – 3	Hershey Bears	DCU Center	Recap
No scoring		First period	No scoring
Eriah Hayes (1) – 02:46		Second period	01:03 – Jim O'Brien (1); 03:34 – Chris Conner (1); 13:58 – Cameron Schilling (1)
No scoring		Third period	No scoring
Aaron Dell 26 saves / 29 shots		Goalie stats	Pheonix Copley 33 saves / 34 shots

April 29	Hershey Bears	1 – 4	Worcester Sharks	Giant Center	Recap
Liam O'Brien (1) – 03:13		First period	No scoring
No scoring		Second period	01:01 – pp – Chris Tierney (1); 3:55 – Ryan Carpenter (1)
No scoring		Third period	05:37 – pp – Taylor Fedun (1); 19:53 – en – Micheal Haley (2)
Pheonix Copley 29 saves / 32 shots		Goalie stats	Troy Grosenick 27 saves / 28 shots

May 1	Hershey Bears	10 – 4	Worcester Sharks	Giant Center	Recap
Chris Brown (2) – 0:24; Dustin Gazley (1) – sh – 03:44; Jakub Vrana – 10:40; Casey Wellman (1) – pp – 16:10		First period	12:17 – Dylan DeMelo (1)
Cameron Schilling (2) – 09:05; Tim Kennedy (1) – pp – 19:32		Second period	4:07 – pp – Karl Stollery (1)
Casey Wellman (2) – pp – 0:19; Liam O'Brien (2) – pp – 01:28; Casey Wellman (3) – 2:09; Chris Brown (3) – 08:06		Third period	11:05 – Rylan Schwartz (1); 15:07 – Matt Taormina (1)
Philipp Grubauer 19 saves / 21 shots Pheonix Copley 11 saves / 13 shots		Goalie stats	Troy Grosenick 12 saves / 16 shots Aaron Dell 26 saves / 32 shots

Hershey wins series 3–1

==== (3) Hartford Wolf Pack vs. (6) Providence Bruins ====
April 22	Hartford Wolf Pack	3 – 1	Providence Bruins	XL Center	Recap
Steve Spinell (1) – 04:58		First period	No scoring
Danny Kristo (1) – 03:19		Second period	08:34 – pp – Zach Trotman (1)
Carl Klingberg (1) – en – 19:56		Third period	No scoring
Yann Danis 28 saves / 29 shots		Goalie stats	Jeremy Smith 22 saves / 24 shots

April 25	Hartford Wolf Pack	1 – 2	Providence Bruins	XL Center	Recap
No scoring		First period	No scoring
Chris Bourque (1) – 12:21		Second period	No scoring
No scoring		Third period	02:28 – pp – Paul Carey (1); 04:36 – Alexander Khokhlachev (1)
Yann Danis 28 saves / 30 shots		Goalie stats	Jeremy Smith 20 saves / 21 shots

April 26	Providence Bruins	2 – 1	3OT	Hartford Wolf Pack	Dunkin' Donuts Center	Recap
No scoring		First period		10:33 – pp – Brady Skjei (1)
Alexander Khokhlachev (2) – 19:54		Second period		No scoring
No scoring		Third period		No scoring
Seth Griffith (1) – 02:00		Third overtime period		No scoring
Malcolm Subban 46 saves / 47 shots		Goalie stats		Yann Danis 45 saves / 47 shots

April 28	Providence Bruins	1 – 2	Hartford Wolf Pack	Dunkin' Donuts Center	Recap
No scoring		First period	No scoring
No scoring		Second period	3:06 – Mathew Bodie (1)
Seth Griffith (2) – pp – 12:54		Third period	2:04 – Tyler Brown (1)
Malcolm Subban 15 saves / 17 shots		Goalie stats	Yann Danis 28 saves / 29 shots

May 1	Hartford Wolf Pack	3 – 2	OT	Providence Bruins	XL Center	Recap
No scoring		First period		No scoring
Chris Mueller (1) – pp – 17:27		Second period		07:55 – Colin Stuart (1)
Chris Mueller (2) – pp – 19:14		Third period		07:36 – pp – Tommy Cross (1)
Tommy Hughes (1) – 04:35		First overtime period		No scoring
Yann Danis 38 saves / 40 shots		Goalie stats		Jeremy Smith 39 saves / 42 shots

Hartford wins series 3–2

==== (4) Wilkes-Barre/Scranton Penguins vs. (5) Syracuse Crunch ====
April 24	Wilkes-Barre/Scranton Penguins	5 – 1	Syracuse Crunch	Mohegan Sun Arena at Casey Plaza	Recap
Dominik Uher (1) – 16:52		First period	No scoring
Kasperi Kapanen (1) – 06:03; Carter Rowney (1) – 06:34; Kasperi Kapanen (2) – 07:43		Second period	14:00 – Matthew Peca (1)
Danny Syvret (1) – 12:32		Third period	No scoring
Matt Murray 22 saves / 23 shots		Goalie stats	Kristers Gudlevskis 16 saves / 20 shots Adam Wilcox 14 saves / 15 shots

April 25	Wilkes-Barre/Scranton Penguins	4 – 0	Syracuse Crunch	Mohegan Sun Arena at Casey Plaza	Recap
Jayson Megna (1) – pp – 02:32; Carter Rowney (2) – pp – 16:32; Tom Kostopoulos (1) – pp – 19:59		First period	No scoring
No scoring		Second period	No scoring
Kasperi Kapanen (3) – 16:10		Third period	No scoring
Matt Murray 27 saves / 27 shots		Goalie stats	Kristers Gudlevskis 25 saves / 29 shots

April 29	Syracuse Crunch	2 – 5	Wilkes-Barre/Scranton Penguins	Oncenter War Memorial Arena	Recap
Yanni Gourde (1) – pp – 16:53		First period	07:53 – pp – Scott Wilson (1)
No scoring		Second period	02:39 – Conor Sheary (1)
Tanner Richard (1) – 05:36		Third period	01:59 – pp – Conor Sheary (2); 04:30 – pp – Derrick Pouliot (1); 18:42 – en –Andrew Ebbett (1)
Kristers Gudlevskis 19 saves / 23 shots		Goalie stats	Matt Murray 33 saves / 35 shots

Wilkes-Barre/Scranton wins series 3–0

=== Western Conference ===
==== (1) Utica Comets vs. (8) Chicago Wolves ====
April 22	Chicago Wolves	2 – 3	2OT	Utica Comets	Allstate Arena	Recap
No scoring		First period		01:56 – Hunter Shinkaruk (1); 10:28 – Nicklas Jensen (1)
No scoring		Second period		No scoring
Magnus Paajarvi (1) – 01:25; Magnus Paajarvi (2) – 19:59		Third period		No scoring
No scoring		Second overtime period		03:10 – Bobby Sanguinetti (1)
Jordan Binnington 40 saves / 43 shots		Goalie stats		Jacob Markstrom 30 saves / 32 shots

April 24	Chicago Wolves	2 – 1	Utica Comets	Allstate Arena	Recap
No scoring		First period	No scoring
Brent Regner (1) – pp – 01:10; Jeremy Welsh (1) – 11:52		Second period	10:10 – Hunter Shinkaruk (2)
No scoring		Third period	No scoring
Jordan Binnington 30 saves / 31 shots		Goalie stats	Jacob Markstrom 20 saves / 22 shots

April 29	Utica Comets	2 – 1	OT	Chicago Wolves	Utica Memorial Auditorium	Recap
No scoring		First period		18:31 – Colin Fraser (1)
No scoring		Second period		No scoring
Adam Clendening (1) – pp – 06:58		Third period		No scoring
Darren Archibald (1) – 10:58		First overtime period		No scoring
Jacob Markstrom 26 saves / 27 shots		Goalie stats		Jordan Binnington 50 saves / 52 shots

May 1	Utica Comets	3 – 4	OT	Chicago Wolves	Utica Memorial Auditorium	Recap
Cory Conacher (1) – pp – 06:43; Adam Clendening (2) – 14:56		First period		10:59 – Adam Cracknell (1)
No scoring		Second period		01:21 – Mathieu Brodeur (1); 12:26 – pp – Benn Ferriero (1)
Bobby Sanguinetti (2) – pp – 05:05		Third period		No scoring
No scoring		First overtime period		02:19 – pp – Joel Edmundson (1)
Jacob Markstrom 28 saves / 32 shots		Goalie stats		Jordan Binnington 35 saves / 38 shots

May 2	Utica Comets	4 – 2	Chicago Wolves	Utica Memorial Auditorium	Recap
No scoring		First period	No scoring
Brandon DeFazio (1) – 0:18; Brendan Gaunce (1) – pp – 12:36; Brendan Gaunce (2) – pp – 15:07		Second period	07:11 – pp – Magnus Paajarvi (3); 13:06 – Joel Edmundson (2)
Sven Baertschi (1) – en – 19:16		Third period	No scoring
Jacob Markstrom 17 saves / 19 shots		Goalie stats	Jordan Binnington 27 saves / 30 shots

Utica wins series 3–2

==== (2) Grand Rapids Griffins vs. (7) Toronto Marlies ====
April 25	Toronto Marlies	7 – 4	Grand Rapids Griffins	Ricoh Coliseum	Recap
T. J. Brennan (1) – 0:26; Greg McKegg (1) – 12:55		First period	17:04 – pp – Andreas Athanasiou (1)
Ryan Rupert (1) – 15:31; Byron Froese (1) – 19:56		Second period	0:40 – Teemu Pulkkinen (1); 10:12 – Louis-Marc Aubry (1)
Brendan Leipsic (1) – 05:51; Jack Rodewald (1) – 11:19; Josh Leivo (1) – en – 18:03		Third period	14:51 – pp – Teemu Pulkkinen (2)
Christopher Gibson 24 saves / 28 shots		Goalie stats	Tom McCollum 28 saves / 34 shots

April 26	Toronto Marlies	5 – 2	Grand Rapids Griffins	Ricoh Coliseum	Recap
Matt Frattin (1) – 16:54		First period	04:42 – Teemu Pulkkinen (3); 05:25 – pp – Andy Miele (1)
Matt Frattin (2) – pp – 02:35		Second period	No scoring
T. J. Brennan (2) – pp – 13:24; Connor Brown (1) – en – 19:03; Greg McKegg (2) – en – 19:47		Third period	No scoring
Christopher Gibson 26 saves / 28 shots		Goalie stats	Jared Coreau 21 saves / 24 shots

April 29	Grand Rapids Griffins	5 – 2	Toronto Marlies	Van Andel Arena	Recap
Andy Miele (2) – 07:51		First period	06:33 – Troy Bodie (1)
Andreas Athanasiou (2) – pp – 07:18		Second period	No scoring
Tyler Bertuzzi (1) – 09:11; Teemu Pulkkinen (4) – 09:49; Teemu Pulkkinen (5) – en – 16:07		Third period	12:32 – pp – Brendan Mikkelson (1)
Tom McCollum 25 saves / 27 shots		Goalie stats	Christopher Gibson 25 saves / 29 shots

May 2	Grand Rapids Griffins	5 – 4	Toronto Marlies	Van Andel Arena	Recap
Tomas Nosek (1) – sh – 06:44; Tomas Nosek (2) – pp – 11:07		First period	00:46 – Matt Frattin (3)
No scoring		Second period	02:24 – Ryan Rupert (2)
Andreas Athanasiou (3) – 02:30; Teemu Pulkkinen (6) – pp – 05:52; Tyler Bertuzzi (2) – 15:18		Third period	18:55 – Brendan Mikkelson (2); 19:20 – T. J. Brennan (3)
Tom McCollum 28 saves / 32 shots		Goalie stats	Christopher Gibson 22 saves / 27 shots

May 3	Grand Rapids Griffins	3 – 1	Toronto Marlies	Van Andel Arena	Recap
Louis-Marc Aubry (2) – 08:49		First period	No scoring
Alden Hirschfeld (1) – 12:35		Second period	02:24 – Sam Carrick (1)
Andreas Athanasiou (4) – 03:38		Third period	No scoring
Tom McCollum 35 saves / 36 shots		Goalie stats	Christopher Gibson 39 saves / 42 shots

Grand Rapids wins series 3–2

==== (3) San Antonio Rampage vs. (6) Oklahoma City Barons ====
April 23	Oklahoma City Barons	5 – 2	San Antonio Rampage	Cox Convention Center	Recap
Brad Hunt (1) – pp – 12:04		First period	15:56 – Vincent Trocheck (1)
No scoring		Second period	08:01 – Rocco Grimaldi (1)
Joshua Winquist (1) – pp – 10:22; Ryan Hamilton (1) – 14:05; Connor Jones (1) – en – 18:39; Matthew Ford (1) – en – 19:52		Third period	No scoring
Laurent Brossoit 29 saves / 31 shots		Goalie stats	Dan Ellis 33 saves / 36 shots

April 25	Oklahoma City Barons	4 – 3	OT	San Antonio Rampage	Cox Convention Center	Recap
No scoring		First period		09:16 – Connor Brickley (1); 12:34 – pp – Corban Knight (1)
Ryan Hamilton (2) – pp – 17:27		Second period		06:44 – John McFarland (1)
Jordan Oesterle (1) – pp – 16:43; Matthew Ford (2) – pp – 19:24		Third period		No scoring
Connor Jones (2) – 04:01		First overtime period		No scoring
Laurent Brossoit 21 saves / 24 shots Richard Bachman 16 saves / 16 shots		Goalie stats		Michael Houser 35 saves / 39 shots

April 29	San Antonio Rampage	1 – 2	OT	Oklahoma City Barons	AT&T Center	Recap
No scoring		First period		No scoring
No scoring		Second period		18:51 – Kellen Jones (1)
Dylan Olsen (1) – 19:01		Third period		No scoring
No scoring		First overtime period		05:01 – Jujhar Khaira (1)
Dan Ellis 36 saves / 38 shots		Goalie stats		Richard Bachman 35 saves / 36 shots

Oklahoma City wins series 3–0

==== (4) Rockford IceHogs vs. (5) Texas Stars ====
April 24	Texas Stars	2 – 4	Rockford IceHogs	Cedar Park Center	Recap
No scoring		First period	06:23 – pp – Spencer Abbott (1)
Curtis McKenzie (1) – 16:37		Second period	No scoring
Julius Honka (1) – pp – 04:24		Third period	08:31 – pp – Spencer Abbott (2); 12:19 – Kirill Gotovets (1); 18:56 – en – Ryan Hartman (1)
Jussi Rynnas 33 saves / 36 shots		Goalie stats	Michael Leighton 33 saves / 35 shots

April 25	Texas Stars	1 – 4	Rockford IceHogs	Cedar Park Center	Recap
No scoring		First period	09:28 – Garret Ross (1); 18:01 – Tanner Kero (1)
No scoring		Second period	No scoring
Brett Ritchie (1) – 11:58		Third period	16:17 – pp – Peter Regin (1); 18:10 – en – Brandon Mashinter (1)
Jack Campbell 24 saves / 27 shots		Goalie stats	Michael Leighton 34 saves / 35 shots

April 29	Rockford IceHogs	3 – 2	OT	Texas Stars	BMO Harris Bank Center	Recap
Phillip Danault (1) – 03:43		First period		19:21 – Devin Shore (1)
No scoring		Second period		18:41 – Scott Glennie (1)
Phillip Danault (2) – 09:51		Third period		No scoring
Stephen Johns (1) – 00:23		First overtime period		No scoring
Michael Leighton 39 saves / 41 shots		Goalie stats		Jussi Rynnas 38 saves / 41 shots

Rockford wins series 3–0

== Conference semifinals ==
=== Eastern Conference ===
==== (1) Manchester Monarchs vs. (4) Wilkes-Barre/Scranton Penguins ====
May 6	Manchester Monarchs	4 – 3	3OT	Wilkes-Barre/Scranton Penguins	Verizon Wireless Arena	Recap
Nick Shore (1) – 00:18; Brian O'Neill (4) – 10:49		First period		03:34 – Taylor Chorney (1); 19:49 – pp – Scott Wilson (2)
Colin Miller (1) – 11:50		Second period		No scoring
No scoring		Third period		08:19 – Conor Sheary (3)
Zach O'Brien (1) – 04:13		Third overtime period		No scoring
Jean-Francois Berube 40 saves / 43 shots		Goalie stats		Matt Murray 52 saves / 56 shots

May 7	Manchester Monarchs	5 – 2	Wilkes-Barre/Scranton Penguins	Verizon Wireless Arena	Recap
Brian O'Neill (5) – 09:28		First period	No scoring
Justin Auger (1) – 12:38; Jordan Weal (6) – 17:03		Second period	12:28 – pp – Conor Sheary (4); 12:52 – Dominik Uher (2)
Jordan Weal (7) – pp – 05:24; Brian O'Neill 6 – en – 17:57		Third period	No scoring
Jean-Francois Berube 18 saves / 20 shots		Goalie stats	Matt Murray 29 saves / 33 shots

May 9	Wilkes-Barre/Scranton Penguins	2 – 1	Manchester Monarchs	Mohegan Sun Arena at Casey Plaza	Recap
Bryan Rust (1) – 06:22		First period	No scoring
Tom Kostopoulos (2) – pp – 13:27		Second period	No scoring
No scoring		Third period	13:01 – David Van der Gulik (1)
Matt Murray 29 saves / 30 shots		Goalie stats	Jean-Francois Berube 18 saves / 20 shots

May 11	Wilkes-Barre/Scranton Penguins	2 – 5	Manchester Monarchs	Mohegan Sun Arena at Casey Plaza	Recap
No scoring		First period	00:42 – Jordan Weal (8)
No scoring		Second period	05:45 – sh – Michael Mersch (6); 12:57 – Jordan Weal (9); 16:53 – David Van der Gulik (2)
Tom Kostopoulos (3) – 10:58; Bryan Rust (2) – 11:35		Third period	09:45 – pp – Jordan Weal (10)
Matt Murray 21 saves / 25 shots Jeff Zatkoff 1 save / 2 shots		Goalie stats	Jean-Francois Berube 27 saves / 29 shots

May 12	Wilkes-Barre/Scranton Penguins	1 – 2	Manchester Monarchs	Mohegan Sun Arena at Casey Plaza	Recap
No scoring		First period	02:01 – Adrian Kempe (2); 14:57 – Nick Shore (2)
Conor Sheary (5) – 18:43		Second period	No scoring
No scoring		Third period	No scoring
Matt Murray 4 saves / 6 shots Jeff Zatkoff 22 saves / 22 shots		Goalie stats	Jean-Francois Berube 28 saves / 29 shots

Manchester wins series 4–1

==== (2) Hershey Bears vs. (3) Hartford Wolf Pack ====
May 6	Hershey Bears	1 – 2	OT	Hartford Wolf Pack	Giant Center	Recap
Chris Conner (2) – 19:06		First period		No scoring
No scoring		Second period		05:28 – pp – Chris Mueller (3)
No scoring		Third period		No scoring
No scoring		First overtime period		16:47 – Chris Bourque (2)
Philipp Grubauer 41 saves / 43 shots		Goalie stats		Yann Danis 36 saves / 37 shots

May 8	Hershey Bears	6 – 4	Hartford Wolf Pack	Giant Center	Recap
Tim Kennedy (2) – 05:19		First period	07:33 – Joey Crabb (1); 10:26 – pp – Chris Bourque (3); 13:27 – Chad Nehring (1)
Tim Kennedy (3) – 03:40; Nate Schmidt (2) – 09:09; Jim O'Brien (2) – pp – 15:33; Jakub Vrana (2) – 18:43		Second period	08:57 – Mathew Bodie (2)
Jim O'Brien (3) – en, sh – 19:02		Third period	No scoring
Philipp Grubauer 13 saves / 17 shots Pheonix Copley 9 saves / 9 shots		Goalie stats	Yann Danis 23 saves / 28 shots

May 10*	Hartford Wolf Pack	1 – 2	Hershey Bears	XL Center	Recap
No scoring		First period	No scoring
Joey Crabb (2) – sh – 19:19		Second period	01:07 – Nate Schmidt (3)
No scoring		Third period	10:23 – sh – Cameron Schilling (3)
Yann Danis 20 saves / 22 shots		Goalie stats	Philipp Grubauer 31 saves / 32 shots

May 11*	Hartford Wolf Pack	3 – 1	Hershey Bears	XL Center	Recap
Joey Crabb (3) – 16:11		First period	No scoring
Oscar Lindberg (1) – pp – 08:45; Ryan Haggerty (1) – 13:09		Second period	No scoring
No scoring		Third period	12:02 – Jon Landry (1)
Yann Danis 22 saves / 23 shots		Goalie stats	Philipp Grubauer 29 saves / 32 shots

May 13	Hershey Bears	4 – 5	OT	Hartford Wolf Pack	Giant Center	Recap
Connor Carrick (2) – pp – 07:21; Chandler Stephenson (1) – 08:44; Garrett Mitchell (1) – sh – 09:44		First period		02:39 – pp – Danny Kristo (2)
No scoring		Second period		06:22 – Conor Allen (1)
Liam O'Brien (3) – 13:27		Third period		12:09 – Chris Bourque (4); 16:36 – Chris Mueller (4)
No scoring		First overtime period		11:39 – sh – Chris Mueller (5)
Philipp Grubauer 37 saves / 42 shots		Goalie stats		Yann Danis 34 saves / 38 shots

May 15	Hartford Wolf Pack	6 – 3	Hershey Bears	XL Center	Recap
Marek Hrivik (1) – 09:02		First period	01:24 – Andre Burakovsky (1)
Marek Hrivik (2) – 01:26; Michael Kostka (1) – 09:00; Joey Crabb – sh – 16:37		Second period	05:39 – sh – Dustin Gazley (2)
Carl Klingberg (2) – 14:14; Marek Hrivik (3) – 19:24		Third period	12:44 – Nate Schmidt (4)
Yann Danis 23 saves / 26 shots		Goalie stats	Philipp Grubauer 31 saves / 36 shots

Hartford wins series 4–2

*The games scheduled for May 10 and May 11 were played at DCU Center due to the lack of availability at XL Center.

=== Western Conference ===
==== (1) Utica Comets vs. (6) Oklahoma City Barons ====
May 7	Utica Comets	1 – 2	4OT	Oklahoma City Barons	Utica Memorial Auditorium	Recap
Kent Huskins (1) – 17:10		First period		No scoring
No scoring		Second period		04:13 – Kellen Jones (2)
No scoring		Third period		No scoring
No scoring		Fourth overtime period		0:16 – Curtis Hamilton (1)
Jacob Markstrom 65 saves / 67 shots		Goalie stats		Richard Bachman 56 saves / 57 shots

May 8	Utica Comets	2 – 1	OT	Oklahoma City Barons	Utica Memorial Auditorium	Recap
No scoring		First period		08:50 – Connor Jones (3)
No scoring		Second period		No scoring
Adam Clendening (3) – 01:31		Third period		No scoring
Alexandre Grenier (1) – 03:32		First overtime period		No scoring
Jacob Markstrom 22 saves / 23 shots		Goalie stats		Richard Bachman 36 saves / 38 shots

May 11	Oklahoma City Barons	2 – 3	Utica Comets	Cox Convention Center	Recap
Andrew Miller (2) – sh – 15:10		First period	01:20 – Alex Friesen (1); 12:35 – Alexandre Grenier (2)
No scoring		Second period	No scoring
Joshua Winquist (1) – pp – 03:08		Third period	04:50 – Mike Zalewski (1)
Richard Bachman 25 saves / 28 shots		Goalie stats	Jacob Markstrom 20 saves / 22 shots

May 13	Oklahoma City Barons	7 – 4	Utica Comets	Cox Convention Center	Recap
Jujhar Khaira (1) – 09:30		First period	01:20 – Hunter Shinkaruk (3)
Andrew Miller (3) – pp – 01:16; Matthew Ford (2) – pp – 13:08; Jujhar Khaira (2) - 17:34		Second period	06:50 – pp – Sven Baertschi (2); 11:34 – Alex Friesen (2)
Ryan Hamilton (4) – pp – 09:12; Brandon Davidson (1) – pp – 11:29; Brad Hunt (1) – 17:15		Third period	16:56 – Brendan Gaunce (3)
Richard Bachman 38 saves / 42 shots		Goalie stats	Jacob Markstrom 17 saves / 23 shots

May 14	Oklahoma City Barons	1 – 3	Utica Comets	Cox Convention Center	Recap
No scoring		First period	12:13 – Wacey Hamilton (1)
No scoring		Second period	03:54 – Peter Andersson (1)
Brad Hunt (2) – pp – 18:51		Third period	19:44 – en – Alexandre Grenier (3)
Richard Bachman 29 saves / 31 shots		Goalie stats	Jacob Markstrom 33 saves / 34 shots

May 18	Utica Comets	1 – 2	Oklahoma City Barons	Utica Memorial Auditorium	Recap
No scoring		First period	05:23 – Brad Hunt (3)
No scoring		Second period	No scoring
Sven Baertschi (3) – 14:13		Third period	08:26 – Ryan Hamilton (5)
Jacob Markstrom 19 saves / 21 shots		Goalie stats	Richard Bachman 33 saves / 34 shots

May 20	Utica Comets	1 – 0	Oklahoma City Barons	Utica Memorial Auditorium	Recap
No scoring		First period	No scoring
No scoring		Second period	No scoring
Alexandre Grenier (4) – 07:11		Third period	No scoring
Jacob Markstrom 35 saves / 35 shots		Goalie stats	Richard Bachman 39 saves / 40 shots

Utica wins series 4–3

==== (2) Grand Rapids Griffins vs. (4) Rockford IceHogs ====
May 6	Grand Rapids Griffins	5 – 3	Rockford IceHogs	Van Andel Arena	Recap
Kevin Porter (1) – 02:01		First period	No scoring
Teemu Pulkkinen (7) – 13:05; Teemu Pulkkinen (8)– 16:28		Second period	08:41 – Mark McNeill (1)
Teemu Pulkkinen (9) – 17:14; Louis-Marc Aubry (3) – en – 19:42		Third period	03:16 – Stephen Johns (2); 09:20 – Garret Ross (2)
Tom McCollum 34 saves / 37 shots		Goalie stats	Michael Leighton 23 saves / 27 shots

May 8	Grand Rapids Griffins	5 – 1	Rockford IceHogs	Van Andel Arena	Recap
Tyler Bertuzzi (3) – 12:26		First period	06:18 – Brandon Mashinter (2)
Anthony Mantha (1) – 09:32		Second period	No scoring
Teemu Pulkkinen (10) – 01:36; Jeff Hoggan (1) – 07:58; Teemu Pulkkinen (11) – pp – 15:24		Third period	No scoring
Tom McCollum 28 saves / 29 shots		Goalie stats	Michael Leighton 25 saves / 30 shots

May 13	Rockford IceHogs	4 – 1	Grand Rapids Griffins	BMO Harris Bank Center	Recap
Mark McNeill (2) – sh – 12:21; Ryan Hartman (2) – pp – 18:36		First period	No scoring
No scoring		Second period	08:27 – pp – Teemu Pulkkinen (12)
Stephen Johns (3) – 04:50; Spencer Abbott (3) – en – 16:57		Third period	No scoring
Michael Leighton 23 saves / 24 shots		Goalie stats	Tom McCollum 23 saves / 26 shots

May 14	Rockford IceHogs	1 – 2	OT	Grand Rapids Griffins	BMO Harris Bank Center	Recap
No scoring		First period		06:48 – Tyler Bertuzzi (4)
Phillip Danault (3) – 09:01		Second period		No scoring
No scoring		Third period		No scoring
No scoring		First overtime period		00:13 – Tyler Bertuzzi (5)
Michael Leighton 29 saves / 31 shots		Goalie stats		Tom McCollum 27 saves / 28 shots

May 17	Rockford IceHogs	3 – 5	Grand Rapids Griffins	BMO Harris Bank Center	Recap
No scoring		First period	05:01 – pp – Teemu Pulkkinen (13)
Tanner Kero (2) – 05:10		Second period	00:39 – Andy Miele (3); 02:16 – Marek Tvrdon (1); 12:21 – Tyler Bertuzzi (6)
Zach Miskovic (1) – 16:14; Brandon Mashinter (3) – pp – 18:01		Third period	11:38 – en – Jeff Hoggan (2)
Michael Leighton 10 saves / 12 shots Mac Carruth 13 saves / 15 shots		Goalie stats	Tom McCollum 24 saves / 27 shots

Grand Rapids wins series 4–1

== Conference finals ==
=== Eastern Conference ===
==== (1) Manchester Monarchs vs. (3) Hartford Wolf Pack ====
May 21	Manchester Monarchs	3 – 2	Hartford Wolf Pack	Verizon Wireless Arena	Recap
Michael Mersch (7) – 00:35		First period	11:33 – Oscar Lindberg (2)
Nic Dowd (2) – 11:07; Michael Mersch (8) – 16:02		Second period	No scoring
No scoring		Third period	06:43 – Mathew Bodie (2)
Jean-Francois Berube 24 saves / 26 shots		Goalie stats	Yann Danis 22 saves / 25 shots

May 23	Manchester Monarchs	7 – 4	Hartford Wolf Pack	Verizon Wireless Arena	Recap
Sean Backman (2) – 08:37; Michael Mersch (9) – 11:25		First period	No scoring
Michael Mersch (10) – pp – 15:50; Brian O'Neill (7) – 19:10; Sean Backman (3) – 19:51		Second period	04:16 – Oscar Lindberg (3); 05:59 – Carl Klingberg (3); 11:07 – Joey Crabb (5)
Nic Dowd (2) – 07:05; Michael Mersch (11) – 14:13		Third period	16:49 – Carl Klingberg (4)
Jean-Francois Berube 14 saves / 18 shots		Goalie stats	Yann Danis 19 saves / 24 shots Mackenzie Skapski 3 saves / 6 shots

May 26	Hartford Wolf Pack	3 – 5	Manchester Monarchs	XL Center	Recap
Chad Nehring (2) – pp – 13:47		First period	05:11 – Nick Shore (3); 19:26 – Brian O'Neill (8)
No scoring		Second period	05:05 – Adrian Kempe (3)
Danny Kristo (3) – pp – 12:16; Joey Crabb (6) – 19:59		Third period	07:38 – Sean Backman (4); 14:00 – Zach O'Brien (2)
Mackenzie Skapski 29 saves / 34 shots		Goalie stats	Jean-Francois Berube 17 saves / 20 shots

May 27	Hartford Wolf Pack	1 – 3	Manchester Monarchs	XL Center	Recap
No scoring		First period	03:13 – Nic Dowd (4)
Ryan Haggerty (2) – 1:23		Second period	06:18 – Adrian Kempe (4)
No scoring		Third period	08:10 – Brian O'Neill (9)
Yann Danis 28 saves / 31 shots		Goalie stats	Jean-Francois Berube 21 saves / 22 shots

Manchester wins series 4–0

=== Western Conference ===
==== (1) Utica Comets vs. (2) Grand Rapids Griffins ====
May 24	Utica Comets	2 – 1	Grand Rapids Griffins	Utica Memorial Auditorium	Recap
Nicklas Jensen (2) – 00:35; Brandon DeFazio (1) – 11:06		First period	16:03 – pp – Mark Zengerle (1)
No scoring		Second period	No scoring
No scoring		Third period	No scoring
Jacob Markstrom 25 saves / 26 shots		Goalie stats	Tom McCollum 29 saves / 31 shots

May 25	Utica Comets	2 – 4	Grand Rapids Griffins	Utica Memorial Auditorium	Recap
No scoring		First period	15:00 – Dylan Larkin (1); 18:33 – Dylan Larkin (2)
No scoring		Second period	14:12 – pp – Teemu Pulkkinen (14); 17:22 – pp – Tyler Bertuzzi (7)
Brendan Gaunce (4) – pp – 14:20; Sven Baertschi (3) – pp – 17:30		Third period	No scoring
Jacob Markstrom 12 saves / 16 shots Joacim Eriksson 2 saves / 2 shots		Goalie stats	Tom McCollum 29 saves / 31 shots

May 28	Grand Rapids Griffins	1 – 4	Utica Comets	Van Andel Arena	Recap
No scoring		First period	No scoring
No scoring		Second period	03:17 – Sven Baertschi (4); 09:35 – pp – Sven Baertschi (5); 11:53 – Sven Baertschi (6)
Marek Tvrdon (2) – pp – 04:19		Third period	15:23 – Cory Conacher (2)
Tom McCollum 21 saves / 25 shots		Goalie stats	Jacob Markstrom 40 saves / 41 shots

May 29	Grand Rapids Griffins	3 – 2	OT	Utica Comets	Van Andel Arena	Recap
No scoring		First period		No scoring
Xavier Ouellet (1) – pp – 05:48		Second period		08:01 – pp – Alex Friesen (4); 16:12 – Cory Conacher (3)
Anthony Mantha (2) – 05:44		Third period		No scoring
Andreas Athanasiou (5) – 05:05		First overtime period		No scoring
Tom McCollum 34 saves / 36 shots		Goalie stats		Jacob Markstrom 22 saves / 25 shots

May 31	Grand Rapids Griffins	2 – 3	Utica Comets	Van Andel Arena	Recap
Mark Zengerle (2) – pp – 04:20		First period	02:14 – Wacey Hamilton (2); 06:07 – Hunter Shinkaruk (4); 11:47 – Bobby Sanguinetti (3)
Dylan Larkin (3) – pp – 19:14		Second period	No scoring
No scoring		Third period	No scoring
Tom McCollum 18 saves / 21 shots		Goalie stats	Jacob Markstrom 32 saves / 34 shots

June 2	Utica Comets	2 – 0	Grand Rapids Griffins	Utica Memorial Auditorium	Recap
No scoring		First period	No scoring
Cory Conacher (4) – 03:16		Second period	No scoring
Alexandre Grenier (5) – en – 18:46		Third period	No scoring
Jacob Markstrom 21 saves / 21 shots		Goalie stats	Tom McCollum 27 saves / 28 shots

Utica wins series 4–2

== Calder Cup Finals ==
=== Manchester Monarchs vs. Utica Comets ===
June 6	Manchester Monarchs	3–2	OT	Utica Comets	Verizon Wireless Arena	Recap
Brian O'Neill (10) – 16:00		First period		17:01 – pp – Sven Baertschi (7)
No scoring		Second period		No scoring
Michael Mersch (12) – pp – 02:23		Third period		05:24 – Cory Conacher (5)
Michael Mersch (13) – 04:10		First overtime period		No scoring
Jean-Francois Berube 15 saves / 17 shots		Goalie stats		Jacob Markstrom 34 saves / 37 shots

June 7	Manchester Monarchs	2–1	OT	Utica Comets	Verizon Wireless Arena	Recap
Zach O'Brien (3) – pp – 19:05		First period		No scoring
No scoring		Second period		01:12 – Nicklas Jensen (3)
No scoring		Third period		No scoring
Nic Dowd (5) – 05:36		First overtime period		No scoring
Jean-Francois Berube 24 saves / 25 shots		Goalie stats		Jacob Markstrom 37 saves / 39 shots

June 10	Utica Comets	3–2	Manchester Monarchs	Utica Memorial Auditorium	Recap
Cal O'Reilly (1) – 05:45; Alexandre Grenier (6) – 18:58		First period	19:35 – Adrian Kempe (5)
Nicklas Jensen (4) – 06:18		Second period	07:22 – Adrian Kempe (6)
No scoring		Third period	No scoring
Jacob Markstrom 32 saves / 34 shots		Goalie stats	Jean-Francois Berube 8 saves / 9 shots Patrik Bartosak 27 saves / 29 shots

June 12	Utica Comets	3–6	Manchester Monarchs	Utica Memorial Auditorium	Recap
Frank Corrado (1) – 14:09; Sven Baertschi (8) – pp – 18:54		First period	12:45 – Sean Backman (5); 13:17 – Nic Dowd (6)
No scoring		Second period	03:08 – pp – Colin Miller (2); 07:51 – pp – Nick Shore (4); 19:49 – Nic Dowd (7)
Will Acton (1) – 17:54		Third period	06:27 – Adrian Kempe (7)
Jacob Markstrom 27 saves / 33 shots Joacim Eriksson 5 saves / 5 shots		Goalie stats	Patrik Bartosak 22 saves / 25 shots

June 13	Utica Comets	1–2	Manchester Monarchs	Utica Memorial Auditorium	Recap
No scoring		First period	10:02 – Adrian Kempe (8); 13:09 – pp – Vincent LoVerde (2)
No scoring		Second period	No scoring
Cal O'Reilly (2) – 19:45		Third period	No scoring
Jacob Markstrom 17 saves / 19 shots		Goalie stats	Patrik Bartosak 31 saves / 32 shots

Manchester wins Calder Cup 4–1

== Playoff statistical leaders ==
=== Leading skaters ===
These are the top ten skaters based on points. If there is a tie in points, goals take precedence over assists.

GP = Games played; G = Goals; A = Assists; Pts = Points; +/– = Plus–minus; PIM = Penalty minutes

Player	Team	GP	G	A	Pts	PIM
Michael Mersch	Manchester Monarchs	18	13	9	22	8
Jordan Weal	Manchester Monarchs	19	10	12	22	16
Brian O'Neill	Manchester Monarchs	19	10	10	20	12
Cal O'Reilly	Utica Comets	23	2	17	19	4
Teemu Pulkkinen	Grand Rapids Griffins	16	14	4	18	22
Nick Shore	Manchester Monarchs	19	4	14	18	2
Sean Backman	Manchester Monarchs	19	5	12	17	8
Chris Bourque	Hartford Wolf Pack	15	4	13	17	12
Oscar Lindberg	Hartford Wolf Pack	15	3	13	16	6
Sven Baertschi	Utica Comets	21	8	7	15	6

=== Leading goaltenders ===
This is a combined table of the top five goaltenders based on goals against average and the top five goaltenders based on save percentage with at least 180 minutes played. The table is initially sorted by goals against average, with the criterion for inclusion in bold.

GP = Games played; W = Wins; L = Losses; SA = Shots against; GA = Goals against; GAA = Goals against average; SV% = Save percentage; SO = Shutouts; TOI = Time on ice (in minutes)

Player	Team	GP	W	L	SA	GA	GAA	SV%	SO	TOI
Richard Bachman	Oklahoma City Barons	9	5	4	322	15	**1.55**	**.953**	0	580:35
Pheonix Copley	Hershey Bears	5	3	1	130	7	**1.83**	**.946**	0	229:08
Jeremy Smith	Providence Bruins	3	1	2	87	6	**1.96**	**.931**	0	183:19
Jacob Markstrom	Utica Comets	23	12	11	682	51	**2.11**	**.925**	2	1449:40
Jordan Binnington	Chicago Wolves	5	2	3	194	12	**2.16**	**.938**	0	333:15

Preceded by 2014 Calder Cup playoffs	Calder Cup playoffs 2015	Succeeded by 2016 Calder Cup playoffs
