= Michael Mersch =

American ice hockey player (born 1992)

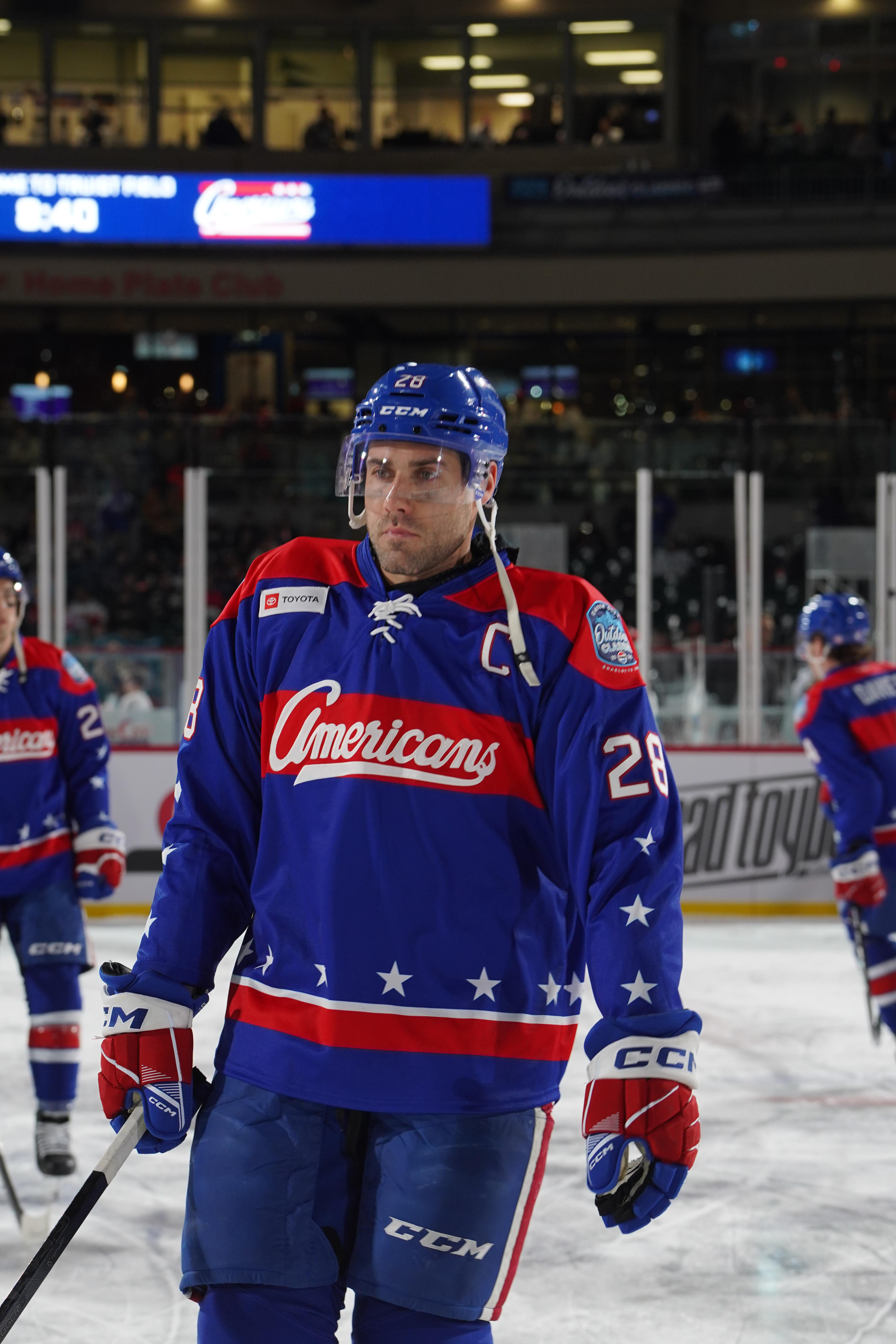
- Mersch with the Rochester Americans in 2024
- Born: October 2, 1992 (age 34) Park Ridge, Illinois, U.S.
- Height: 6 ft 1 in (185 cm)
- Weight: 216 lb (98 kg; 15 st 6 lb)
- Position: Forward
- Shot: Left
- Played for: Los Angeles Kings
- NHL draft: 110th overall, 2011; Los Angeles Kings
- Playing career: 2014–2024

Michael Mersch (born October 2, 1992) is an American former professional ice hockey forward. He was selected by the Los Angeles Kings in the 4th round (110th overall) of the 2011 NHL entry draft.

Growing up in Park Ridge, Illinois, Mersch competed with the Chicago Young Americans and Team Illinois AAA in the Tier 1 Elite Hockey League before joining the USA Hockey National Team Development Program (USNTDP) in 2008. After taking an accelerated course load to finish high school early, Mersch joined the Wisconsin Badgers at the University of Wisconsin–Madison in 2010. While with the Badgers, Mersch set a program record and was named to the All-Big Ten First Team, WCHA All-Academic Team, and West Second-Team All-American.

Mersch finished his collegiate career by signing an entry-level contract with the Los Angeles Kings in April 2014. He was immediately assigned to the Kings' AHL affiliate, the Manchester Monarchs for the remaining 11 games of the season. Mersch made his NHL debut with the Kings on December 11, 2015, and later scored his first career NHL goal on December 29 against the Edmonton Oilers.

== Early life ==
Mersch was born on October 2, 1992, in Park Ridge, Illinois, to parents Michael and Nancy Mersch. His father, whom he was named after, was a defenseman who played professionally in the International Hockey League. Before his father died in 2000 from cancer, Mersch and his younger brother Dominick were motivated by him to play ice hockey. The pair also grew up with a sister, Natalie.

== Playing career ==
=== Amateur career ===
Growing up in Illinois, Mersch competed with the Chicago Young Americans and Team Illinois AAA in the Tier 1 Elite Hockey League (T1EHL). Before joining the USA Hockey National Team Development Program (USNTDP) in 2008, Mersch recorded 35 goals and 75 points for Team Illinois. While competing with the USNTDP, Mersch enrolled in Pioneer High School for his sophomore season. After his successful rookie season with the USNTDP, Mersch garnered the attention of Mike Eaves, the head coach for the Wisconsin Badgers men's ice hockey team. Due to encouragement from Eaves, Mersch took an accelerated course load offered through Brigham Young University and summer school to finish high school a year early. He returned to the USNTDP for his U-18 season where he posted four goals and eight points in 26 games.

=== Collegiate career ===
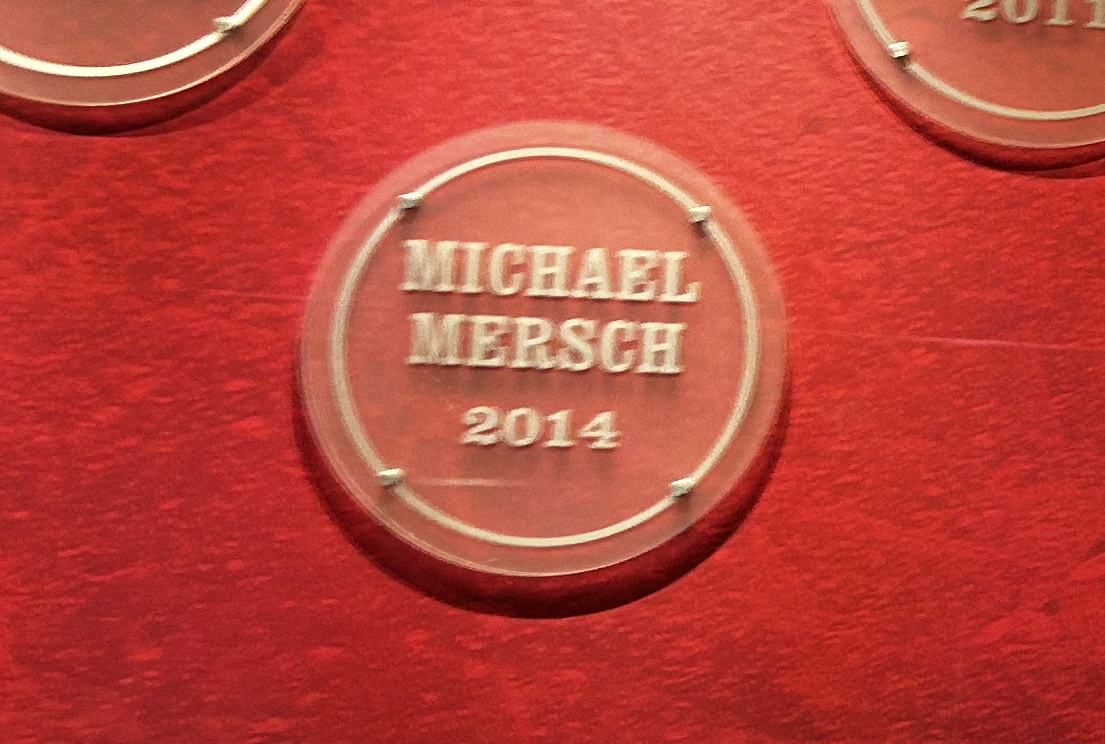
Plaque at LaBahn Arena recognizing Mersch's as one of the All-American recognized alumni of the Wisconsin Badgers

Mersch played for the Wisconsin Badgers at the University of Wisconsin–Madison (UW–Madison) from 2010 to 2014. There, he enrolled in the School of Human Ecology and majored in consumer affairs. Mersch scored his first collegiate goal on October 10, 2010, to help the Badgers shut-out the Holy Cross Crusaders 6–0. Through his first 10 games with the Badgers, Mersch was tried in all three forward positions and scored five goals. In January 2011, Mersch was the highest ranked Badger on the NHL Central Scouting Bureau's Midterm Report for North American players eligible for the 2011 NHL entry draft. At that point, he had recorded 14 points through 26 games and maintained a plus 17 rating for the Badgers. Mersch finished the year leading all team freshmen with 8 goals and 11 assists over a team-high 41 games. With a final scouting ranking of 83, Mersch was drafted 110th overall by the Los Angeles Kings. Prior to the draft, Mersch was praised by Eaves for his work ethic and player development throughout his freshman season, stating: "When you see the work ethic Michael brings, and his willingness to do the little things, hard things and detailed things to get his game to be the best it can be, it's easy to like a young man like that."

Following the draft, Mersch returned to UW–Madison for his sophomore season. When speaking on his decision to return to school, Mersch said: "It gives you time to develop your game, you’re in no rush. … I’m not rushed; I’m just enjoying playing." He scored the Badgers' first goal of the 2011–12 season on October 12 but the team fell 2–1 to the Northern Michigan Wildcats. While the Badgers began the season with a 5–5–1 record, Mersch started with four goals. He finished his sophomore season second on the team in scoring with 14 goals and third on the team with 16 points.

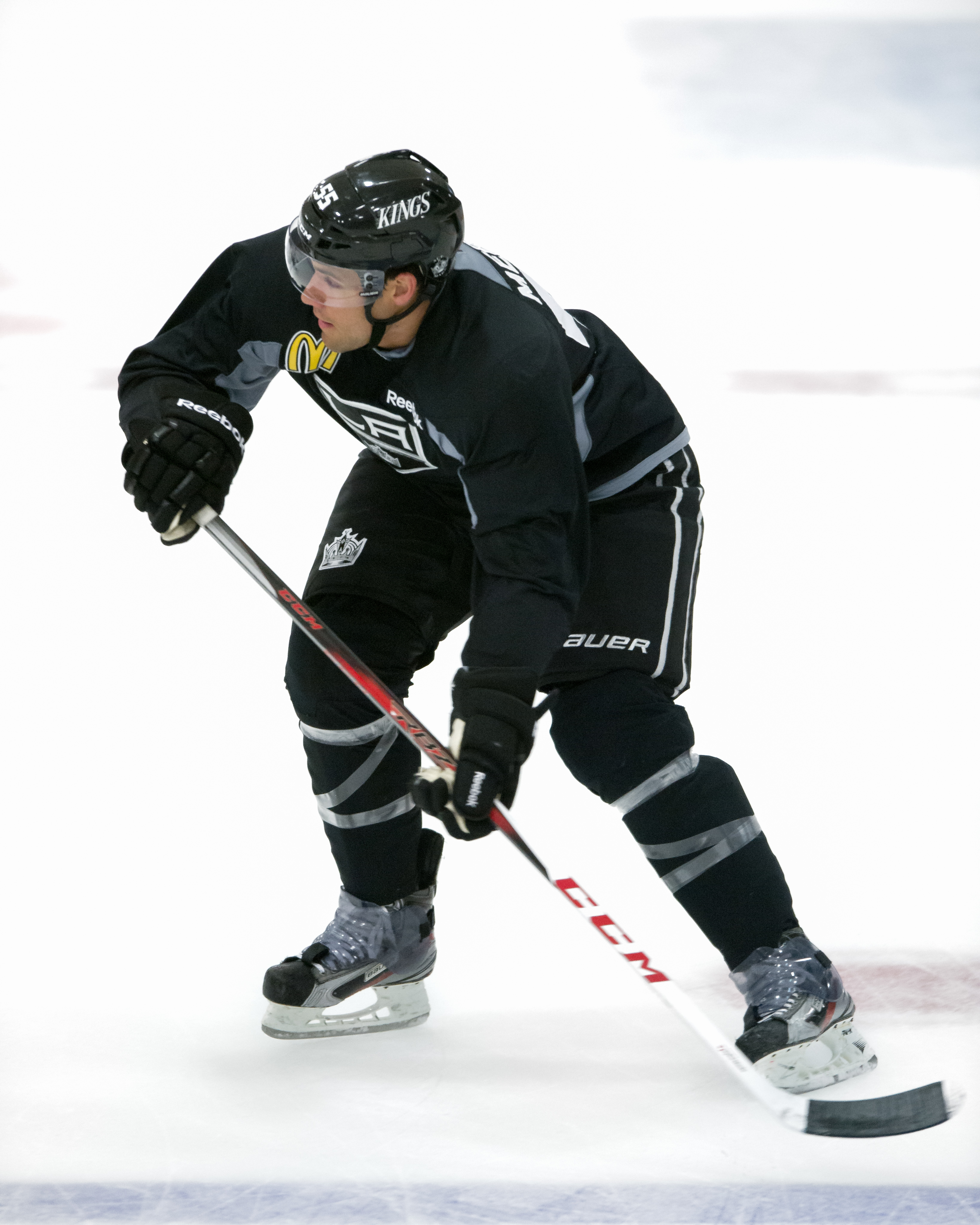
Mersch with the Los Angeles Kings at their 2013 Development Camp.

Mersch once again returned to UW–Madison for his junior season. Although the team began the season with one win over eight games, Mersch had tallied six goals in that span and was one of only two players to score more than one goal. Mersch continued to lead the team in scoring while the Badgers struggled to win games. As the Badgers held a 2–7–5 record, Mersch led the team with nine goals and accounted for 35 per cent of the team's goals. With Mersch's assistance, the Badgers began gaining momentum and won 10 consecutive games. Mersch's efforts were recognized with the Western Collegiate Hockey Association's (WCHA) Offensive Player of the Week after he recorded three goals and six points over two games at the start of March. As the Badgers began improving as the season continued, they finished the 2012–13 season with the Broadmoor Trophy as the WCHA's playoff champions and made their 24th NCAA tournament appearance. Mersch finished the season leading the team, and ranking second in the conference, with 23 goals and 36 points. In spite of this, he was controversially left off of the All-WCHA teams. He also became the fourth player in program history to be responsible for at least 20 percent of a team's goals in a season. Due to his grades, Mersch was named to the WCHA All-Academic team and was nominated for the UW Athletics 2012-13 Athlete of the Year. He was also recognized by his team with the Badgers' Spike Carlson Most Valuable Player award. Once the season was over, Mersch attended the Los Angeles Kings 2013 Development Camp, but intended to return to UW–Madison for his senior year.

In his final year with the Badgers, Mersch led the team in goals, set a program record, and earned numerous Big Ten accolades. Mersch scored his 100th career point with the Badgers on December 13 in a win over the Colorado College Tigers. After scoring again the following game to maintain a five-game goal streak, Mersch earned a Big Ten Second Star of the Week honor on December 17. Mersch scored his first collegiate hat-trick on January 10 against the Michigan Wolverines to lead the team to a 5–2 win. Mersch's production remained steady as the season progressed and he became the first Badger since 2005–06 to notch 20 or more goals in two consecutive seasons. Additionally, his 10 power-play goals marked a milestone, as he became the first Badger player to lead the team in power-play goals for three consecutive seasons. In the Big Ten tournament semifinal against Penn State, Mersch scored the Badgers' only two goals of the game to lead them to the Big Ten Championship. Mersch's outstanding play was rewarded with a selection to the 2013–14 All-Big Ten First Team and West Second-Team All-American. On April 1, 2014, Mersch concluded his collegiate career by signing a three-year entry-level contract with the Los Angeles Kings.

=== Professional career ===
==== Los Angeles Kings organization ====
After finishing his college career, Mersch was assigned to the Kings' American Hockey League (AHL) affiliate, the Manchester Monarchs, for the remainder of the 2013–14 season. Over 11 regular season and playoff games with the Monarchs, Mersch scored two goals and one assist for three points. He then participated in the Los Angeles Kings Development Camp before the start of the 2014–15 season but was again re-assigned to the Monarchs. Mersch started his first full season with the Monarchs registering 10 points over the first 28 games. This included his first game-winning goal on December 6, 2014, against the Norfolk Admirals. Mersch was recognized as the CCM/AHL Rookie of the Month for the month of March after tallying six goals and eight assists for 14 points over 13 games. His efforts also helped propel the Monarchs into first place overall in the league standings. During this stretch, Mersch also recorded his first professional hat-trick on March 27 against the Hershey Bears. He also tallied two assists to finish the game with five points and tied a franchise record for most points in a single game. From March 27 to April 12, Mersch tallied at least one point over eight of the next nine games for a total of eight goals and five assists. His efforts helped the Monarchs clinch their first Macgregor Kilpatrick Trophy in franchise history. Mersch and the Monarchs finished the 2014–15 season with a league-best 50–17–6–3 record and met with the Portland Pirates in the first round of the 2015 Calder Cup playoffs.

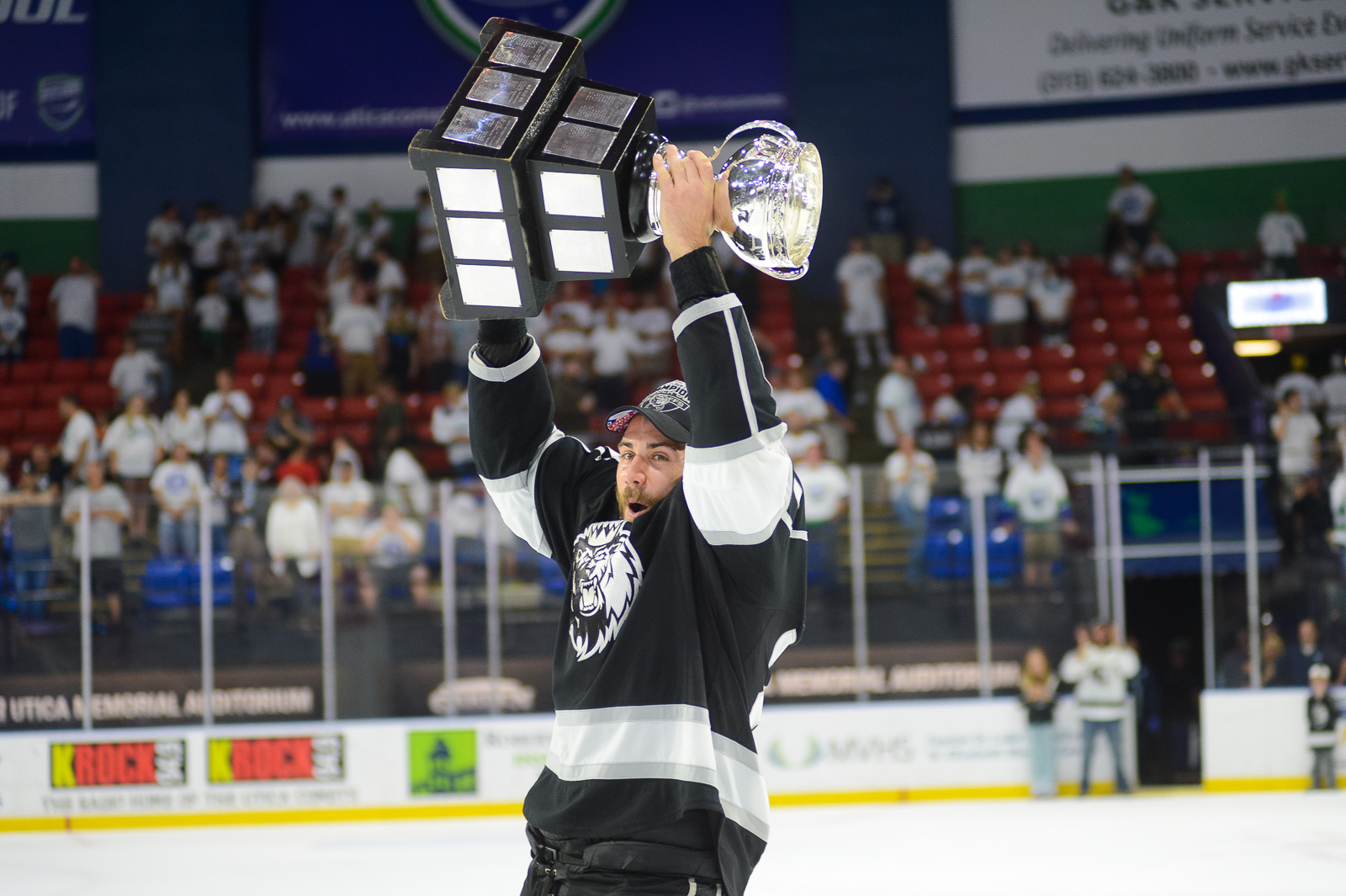
Mersch hoisting the Calder Cup.

The Monarchs won the first two games of their series against the Pirates before conceding Games 3 and 4. In Game 5, Mersch scored two goals and one assist to lead the Monarchs to a 5–3 win over the Pirates. Upon eliminating the Pirates, the Monarchs faced off against the Wilkes-Barre/Scranton Penguins in the Eastern Conference Semi-finals. By Game 4 of the semi-finals, Mersch and his linemates Jordan Weal and Brian O'Neill had combined for 19 points. Mersch also led all rookies in the Calder Cup playoffs with six goals and seven assists for 13 points. After eliminating the Penguins, Mersch ranked ninth on the Monarchs’ all-time playoff points leaders with six goals and eight assists. Over the first two games of the Eastern Conference Finals, Mersch scored five goals to lead the Monarchs to two consecutive wins over the Hartford Wolf Pack. After eliminating the Wolf Pack in four games, Mersch and O’Neill tied for fourth place on the team’s all-time playoff points list with 10 goals and nine assists. Due to an injury in Game 3 against the Wolf Pack, Mersch sat out for the Monarchs series-clinching Game 4 but returned for the Calder Cup Finals against the Utica Comets. In his return, Mersch netted two goals and an assist for 21 points through 14 postseason games. He finished the series with 13 goals and 22 points over 18 games as the Monarchs won their first ever Calder Cup. This would also be the Monarchs final season in the AHL as Kings announced that they would be moving their AHL affiliate to Ontario, California and renaming them the Ontario Reign.

Mersch again participated in the Los Angeles Kings development camp but reassigned to the Ontario Reign for their inaugural 2015–16 season. On December 11, 2015, Mersch made his NHL debut for the Kings in a 3–2 shootout win against the Pittsburgh Penguins. During the game, Mersch registered 2 shots and 3 hits during his 11:01 time on ice. He later scored his first career NHL goal on December 29 against the Edmonton Oilers. While still playing with the Kings, Mersch was selected to represent the Reign at the 2016 AHL All-Star Classic. At the time of the selection, he ranked fifth on the team with 12 goals and three assists through 19 games. His four power-play goals were also tied for the team lead. He was returned to the Reign on January 15, after playing in 15 games and registering one goal and two assists through an average of 10:40 minutes per game. Despite returning in time, Mersch was replaced in the AHL All-Star Game for unstated reasons. Mersch spent a month with the Reign before being recalled to the NHL again on February 19, as a replacement for an injured Anže Kopitar. The call-up only lasted two games as the Kings acquired veteran Kris Versteeg in a trade and Mersch was subsequently returned to the Reign. Through his first four games back with the Reign, Mersch tallied two goals and three assists as the Reign maintained a 4–0–1–0 record. He finished the regular season with the Reign having scored 24 goals through 52 games. His efforts also helped the Reign qualify for the 2016 Calder Cup playoffs but he struggled in their first-round matchup against the San Jose Barracuda. The Reign were eventually eliminated by the Lake Erie Monsters in the Western Conference championship.

In January 2017, Mersh suffered a lower-body injury following a hit by Bakersfield Condors forward Kyle Platzer. He was expected to miss nearly an entire month in order to recover. Despite the injury, Mersch scored 16 goals and 17 assists through 48 games. He signed a one-year, two-way contract extension with the Kings on July 14, 2017, worth an Average Annual Value of $650,000 at the NHL level.

Following the signing of the contract, Mersch again participated in the Los Angeles Kings' development camp before being reassigned to the Ontario Reign for the 2017–18 season. Upon returning to the Reign, Mersch was named an alternate captain alongside Justin Auger, Andrew Crescenzi, and Kevin Gravel. Through his first 45 games of the season, Mersch led all Reign players in points with 33 and power-play goals with nine. He earned his first NHL recall of the season on February 14, 2018.

==== Texas Stars ====
After four full seasons within the Kings organization and having been unable to break into the NHL squad, Mersch left as a free agent and signed a two-year, two-way contract with the Dallas Stars on July 1, 2018. He attended their 2018 training camp but was reassigned to their AHL affiliate, the Texas Stars, to start the 2018–19 season. By mid-January, Mersch ranked eighth on the team with nine goals and 11 assists through 29 games. He was recalled to the NHL level on January 14 but was returned the next day without playing a game.

==== Rochester Americans ====
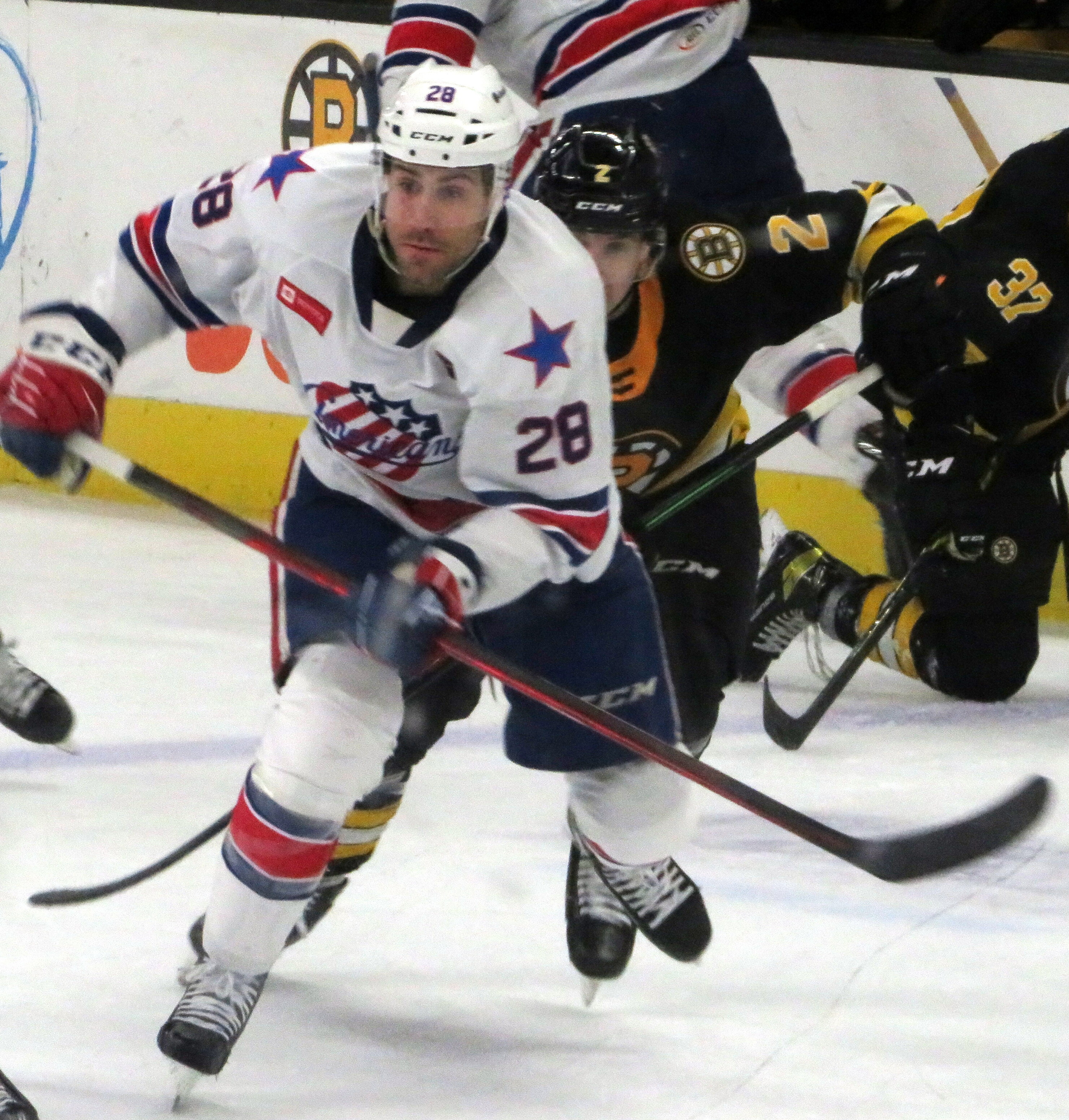
Mersch with the Rochester Americans in 2022.

As a free agent from the Stars at the conclusion of his contract, Mersch was un-signed leading into the pandemic-delayed 2020–21 season. He agreed to a professional tryout contract with the Rochester Americans, the AHL affiliate of the Buffalo Sabres, on February 6, 2021. Despite missing the beginning of the season, Mersch finished the regular season second on the team in scoring with eight goals and 11 assists for 19 points through 28 games. As a result, he signed a two-year AHL contract to remain with the Americans on August 4, 2021.

Mersch missed the first 11 games of the 2022–23 season, but quickly accumulated 20 points in 22 games upon returning. Throughout the season, Mersch set numerous personal records. He played in his 100th game as a Rochester American player on November 25 and then appeared in his 500th professional game on December 10. He collected his 100th point as a Rochester American on February 17 en route to matching his career-high 28 assists. During Game 3 of the 2023 Calder Cup Eastern Conference series, Mersch suffered a head injury following a check by Utica Comets player Robbie Russo. Russo was subsequently suspended one game for the hit.

In his third year as captain, Mersch and the Americans started the 2023–24 season with a 5–1–1–0 record through the opening seven games of the season. This marked their best start of a season since their 2009–10 season. On April 6, Mersch tallied his 400th career AHL point with an overtime goal against the Providence Bruins.

Mersch announced his retirement from professional hockey on September 30, 2024.

== Personal life ==
Mersch and his wife Jenna have one child together.

== Career statistics ==
			Regular season					Playoffs
Season	Team	League	GP	G	A	Pts	PIM	GP	G	A	Pts	PIM
2008–09	U.S. National Development Team	NAHL	42	15	13	28	50	9	5	2	7	4
2009–10	U.S. National Development Team	USHL	27	4	4	8	22	—	—	—	—	—
2010–11	University of Wisconsin	WCHA	41	8	11	19	32	—	—	—	—	—
2011–12	University of Wisconsin	WCHA	37	14	16	30	37	—	—	—	—	—
2012–13	University of Wisconsin	WCHA	42	23	13	36	22	—	—	—	—	—
2013–14	University of Wisconsin	B1G	37	22	13	35	18	—	—	—	—	—
2013–14	Manchester Monarchs	AHL	7	2	1	3	2	4	0	1	1	2
2014–15	Manchester Monarchs	AHL	76	22	23	45	25	18	13	9	22	8
2015–16	Ontario Reign	AHL	52	24	19	43	26	13	2	4	6	4
2015–16	Los Angeles Kings	NHL	17	1	2	3	0	—	—	—	—	—
2016–17	Ontario Reign	AHL	48	16	17	33	46	5	0	3	3	0
2017–18	Ontario Reign	AHL	65	21	28	49	16	4	1	2	3	2
2018–19	Texas Stars	AHL	68	23	22	45	36	—	—	—	—	—
2019–20	Texas Stars	AHL	61	14	13	27	53	—	—	—	—	—
2020–21	Rochester Americans	AHL	28	8	11	19	24	—	—	—	—	—
2021–22	Rochester Americans	AHL	65	26	28	54	39	5	0	0	0	0
2022–23	Rochester Americans	AHL	61	17	28	45	31	14	6	7	13	4
2023–24	Rochester Americans	AHL	66	15	23	38	25	5	2	0	2	2
AHL totals			597	188	213	401	323	68	23	27	50	22
NHL totals			17	1	2	3	0	—	—	—	—	—

== Awards and honors ==
Award	Year	Ref
College
WCHA All-Academic Team	2012–13	
All-Big Ten First Team	2013–14	
AHCA West Second-Team All-American	2013–14	
AHL
Calder Cup (Manchester Monarchs)	2015	
