= Mike Mersch =

American ice hockey player (1964–2000)

- Born: September 29, 1964 Skokie, Illinois, USA
- Died: October 13, 2000
- Height: 6 ft 2 in (188 cm)
- Weight: 210 lb (95 kg; 15 st 0 lb)
- Position: Defense
- Shot: Left
- Played for: IHL; Salt Lake Golden Eagles; Flint Spirits; Muskegon Lumberjacks; AHL; New Haven Nighthawks
- NHL draft: Undrafted
- Playing career: 1986–1991

Mike Mersch (September 29, 1964 - October 13, 2000) was an American professional ice hockey defenseman.

Mersch played five seasons of professional hockey in the International Hockey League (IHL), registering 23 goals, 109 assist, 132 points, 614 penalty minutes, in 328 games played. He retired following the 1990–91 season.

His son, Michael Mersch, is a 2011 draft pick of the Los Angeles Kings.
