= Vincent LoVerde =

American ice hockey player

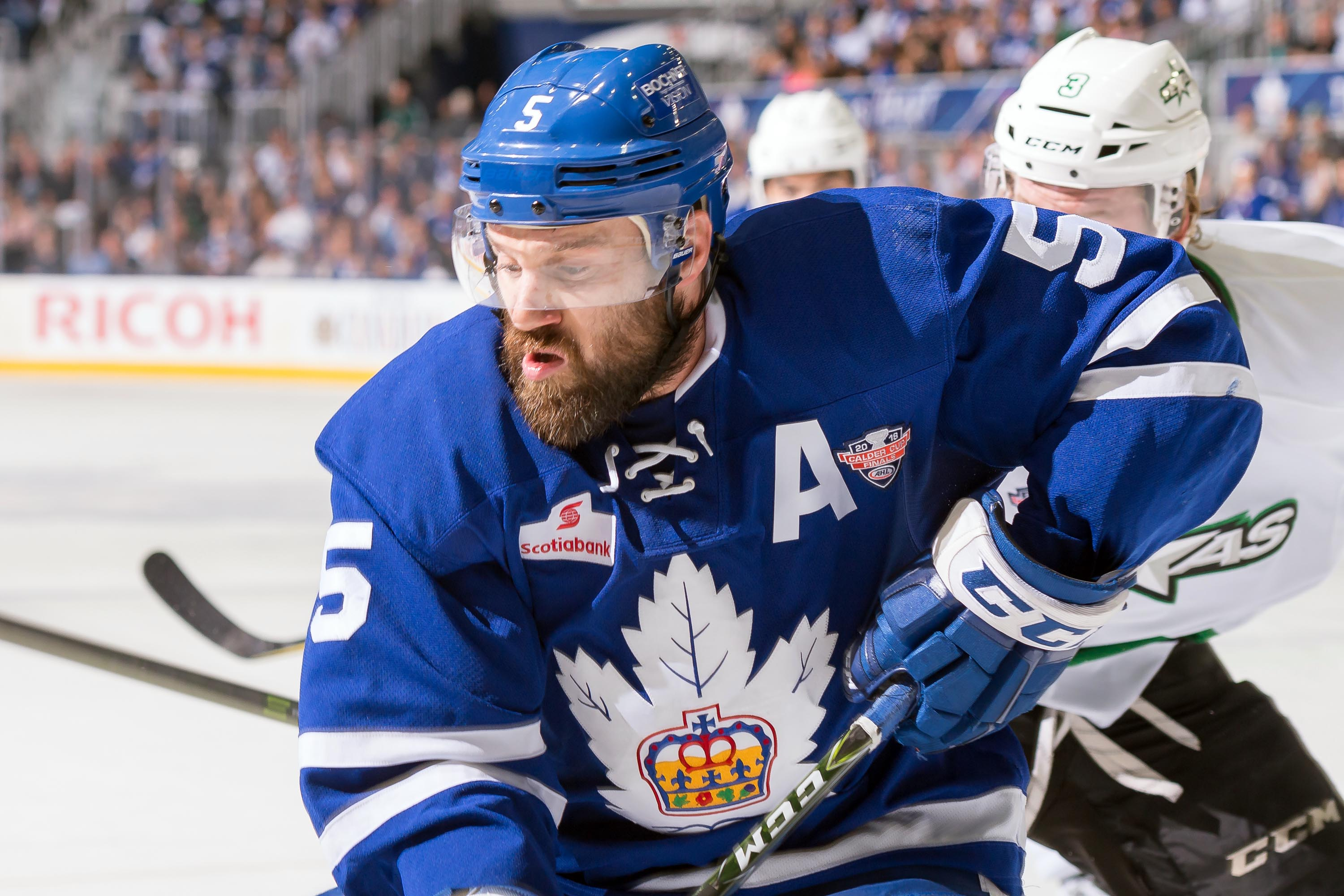
- Vincent LoVerde with the Toronto Marlies in 2018
- Born: April 14, 1989 (age 37) Chicago, Illinois, U.S.
- Height: 5 ft 11 in (180 cm)
- Weight: 201 lb (91 kg; 14 st 5 lb)
- Position: Defense
- Shot: Right
- Played for: Manchester Monarchs; Ontario Reign; Toronto Marlies; Hartford Wolf Pack; EC Red Bull Salzburg; Kunlun Red Star
- NHL draft: Undrafted
- Playing career: 2011–2023

Vincent LoVerde (born April 14, 1989) is an American former professional ice hockey defenseman. He last played with Kunlun Red Star of the Kontinental Hockey League (KHL).

== Playing career ==
On January 9, 2013, LoVerde was loaned from the Ontario Reign of the ECHL to AHL affiliate the Manchester Monarchs, on a professional tryout agreement.

On August 21, 2013, LoVerde was signed to a one-year AHL contract to remain with the Monarchs for the 2013-14 season. In establishing a regular position amongst the Monarchs defense, LoVerde contributed with a career high 20 points in 70 games.

LoVerde was rewarded for his impressive season in signing a one-year contract with NHL affiliate, the Los Angeles Kings, on May 16, 2014. During his time with the Ontario Reign, LoVerde served as the captain from 2015 to 2017. He was also invited to the 2016 and 2017 AHL All-Star Game.

On July 1, 2017, LoVerde left the Kings' affiliate clubs after 6 years, signing as a free agent to a two-year, two-way deal with the Toronto Maple Leafs.

As a free agent and having left a successful tenure within the Maple Leafs organization, LoVerde agreed to a one-year AHL contract with the Hartford Wolf Pack, affiliate to the New York Rangers, on July 1, 2019.

LoVerde played two seasons with the Wolf Pack, captaining the club through the 2020-21 campaign, before leaving the AHL as a free agent, having made over 500 regular-season appearances. On June 24, 2021, LoVerde signed his first contract abroad, agreeing to a one-year deal with Austrian based, EC Red Bull Salzburg of the ICE Hockey League (ICEHL).

== Career statistics ==
			Regular season					Playoffs
Season	Team	League	GP	G	A	Pts	PIM	GP	G	A	Pts	PIM
2005–06	Waterloo Black Hawks	USHL	53	5	6	11	78	—	—	—	—	—
2006–07	Waterloo Black Hawks	USHL	46	4	17	21	96	9	1	2	3	31
2007–08	Miami University	CCHA	42	0	8	8	20	—	—	—	—	—
2008–09	Miami University (Ohio)	CCHA	38	1	7	8	40	—	—	—	—	—
2009–10	Miami University (Ohio)	CCHA	40	3	8	11	48	—	—	—	—	—
2010–11	Miami University (Ohio)	CCHA	39	2	7	9	28	—	—	—	—	—
2011–12	Ontario Reign	ECHL	64	5	19	24	54	5	0	1	1	0
2012–13	Ontario Reign	ECHL	27	7	10	17	15	—	—	—	—	—
2012–13	Manchester Monarchs	AHL	51	2	11	13	30	4	0	0	0	2
2013–14	Manchester Monarchs	AHL	70	2	18	20	46	4	0	0	0	0
2014–15	Manchester Monarchs	AHL	63	9	11	20	63	19	2	8	10	27
2015–16	Ontario Reign	AHL	56	11	21	32	54	13	1	2	3	10
2016–17	Ontario Reign	AHL	61	9	26	35	68	5	0	0	0	6
2017–18	Toronto Marlies	AHL	63	9	12	21	22	20	0	4	4	6
2018–19	Toronto Marlies	AHL	68	3	8	11	33	13	0	6	6	4
2019–20	Hartford Wolf Pack	AHL	62	4	17	21	22	—	—	—	—	—
2020–21	Hartford Wolf Pack	AHL	23	1	2	3	16	—	—	—	—	—
2021–22	EC Red Bull Salzburg	ICEHL	41	2	13	15	12	12	0	1	1	4
2022–23	Kunlun Red Star	KHL	52	2	6	8	28	—	—	—	—	—
AHL totals			517	50	126	176	354	78	3	20	23	55

== Awards and honors ==
Award	Year
AHL
Calder Cup (Manchester Monarchs)	2015
Calder Cup (Toronto Marlies)	2018
