= Ryan Hamilton (ice hockey) =

Canadian ice hockey player (born 1985)

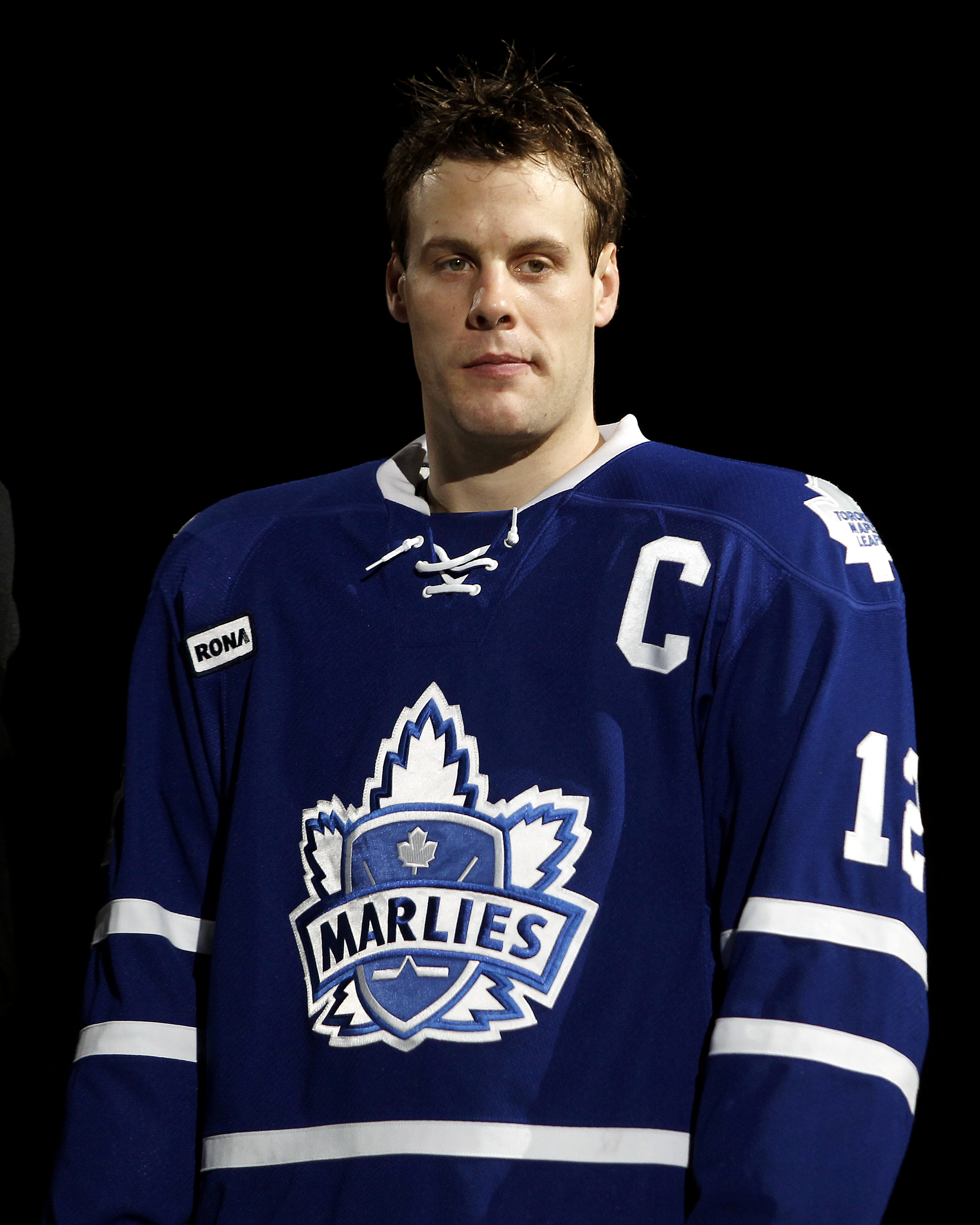
- Hamilton in 2013
- Born: April 15, 1985 (age 41) Oshawa, Ontario, Canada
- Height: 6 ft 2 in (188 cm)
- Weight: 219 lb (99 kg; 15 st 9 lb)
- Position: Left wing
- Shot: Left
- Played for: Toronto Maple Leafs; Edmonton Oilers
- NHL draft: Undrafted
- Playing career: 2006–2018

Ryan Hamilton (born April 15, 1985) is a Canadian former professional ice hockey forward who played in the National Hockey League (NHL) with the Toronto Maple Leafs and the Edmonton Oilers. He spent his last three professional seasons Captaining the Bakersfield Condors of the American Hockey League (AHL).

== Playing career ==
On July 5, 2006, Hamilton was signed as an Undrafted Free Agent by the Minnesota Wild. On January 21, 2009, he was traded to the Toronto Maple Leafs in exchange for Robbie Earl. In 2011, Hamilton was named the captain of the Toronto Marlies.

During the 2011–12 season, he made his NHL debut with the Maple Leafs on March 23, 2012 in a 4-3 win against the New Jersey Devils, registering an assist.

After Hamilton was named MVP of the 2013 AHL All-Star Game, he was recalled to the NHL a few days later. He was also on the Leafs' playoff roster against the Boston Bruins that year. He had one assist in two games. On July 5, 2013, the Edmonton Oilers signed him to a two-year deal where he was reunited with former Toronto Marlies head coach Dallas Eakins. He scored his first NHL goal on February 10, 2015, in a 3–2 loss to the New York Islanders.

After three seasons within the Oilers organization, Hamilton opted to remain with affiliate, the Bakersfield Condors, signing a two-year AHL contract on April 27, 2016.

Upon completing his third season with the Condors in 2017–18, Hamilton ended his 12-year professional career by accepting a pro scouting position with the San Jose Sharks on July 31, 2018.

== Career statistics ==
			Regular season					Playoffs
Season	Team	League	GP	G	A	Pts	PIM	GP	G	A	Pts	PIM
2001–02	Burnaby Bulldogs	BCHL	1	0	0	0	0	—	—	—	—	—
2001–02	Moose Jaw Warriors	WHL	10	0	1	1	6	3	0	0	0	0
2002–03	Moose Jaw Warriors	WHL	5	0	0	0	2	—	—	—	—	—
2002–03	Barrie Colts	OHL	24	3	2	5	10	6	1	0	1	0
2003–04	Barrie Colts	OHL	46	17	10	27	21	7	0	1	1	8
2004–05	Barrie Colts	OHL	37	13	11	24	6	6	2	0	2	2
2005–06	Barrie Colts	OHL	63	46	26	72	58	14	8	9	17	11
2005–06	Houston Aeros	AHL	—	—	—	—	—	1	0	0	0	0
2006–07	Houston Aeros	AHL	62	7	9	16	36	—	—	—	—	—
2007–08	Houston Aeros	AHL	72	20	19	39	38	2	1	0	1	0
2008–09	Houston Aeros	AHL	29	8	4	12	24	—	—	—	—	—
2008–09	Toronto Marlies	AHL	36	7	6	13	33	6	1	2	3	4
2009–10	Toronto Marlies	AHL	47	16	9	25	37	—	—	—	—	—
2010–11	Toronto Marlies	AHL	45	16	12	28	21	—	—	—	—	—
2011–12	Toronto Marlies	AHL	74	25	26	51	36	17	2	3	5	6
2011–12	Toronto Maple Leafs	NHL	2	0	1	1	2	—	—	—	—	—
2012–13	Toronto Marlies	AHL	56	30	18	48	31	4	1	1	2	0
2012–13	Toronto Maple Leafs	NHL	10	0	2	2	0	2	0	1	1	0
2013–14	Oklahoma City Barons	AHL	30	7	9	16	26	—	—	—	—	—
2013–14	Edmonton Oilers	NHL	2	0	0	0	0	—	—	—	—	—
2014–15	Oklahoma City Barons	AHL	43	18	19	37	15	10	5	0	5	2
2014–15	Edmonton Oilers	NHL	16	1	1	2	6	—	—	—	—	—
2015–16	Bakersfield Condors	AHL	60	20	13	33	41	—	—	—	—	—
2016–17	Bakersfield Condors	AHL	49	17	19	36	23	—	—	—	—	—
2017–18	Bakersfield Condors	AHL	41	6	15	21	20	—	—	—	—	—
NHL totals			30	1	4	5	8	2	0	1	1	0

== Awards and honours ==
Award	Year	Ref
AHL
AHL All-Star MVP	2013	
