= Bobby Sanguinetti =

American ice hockey player (born 1988)

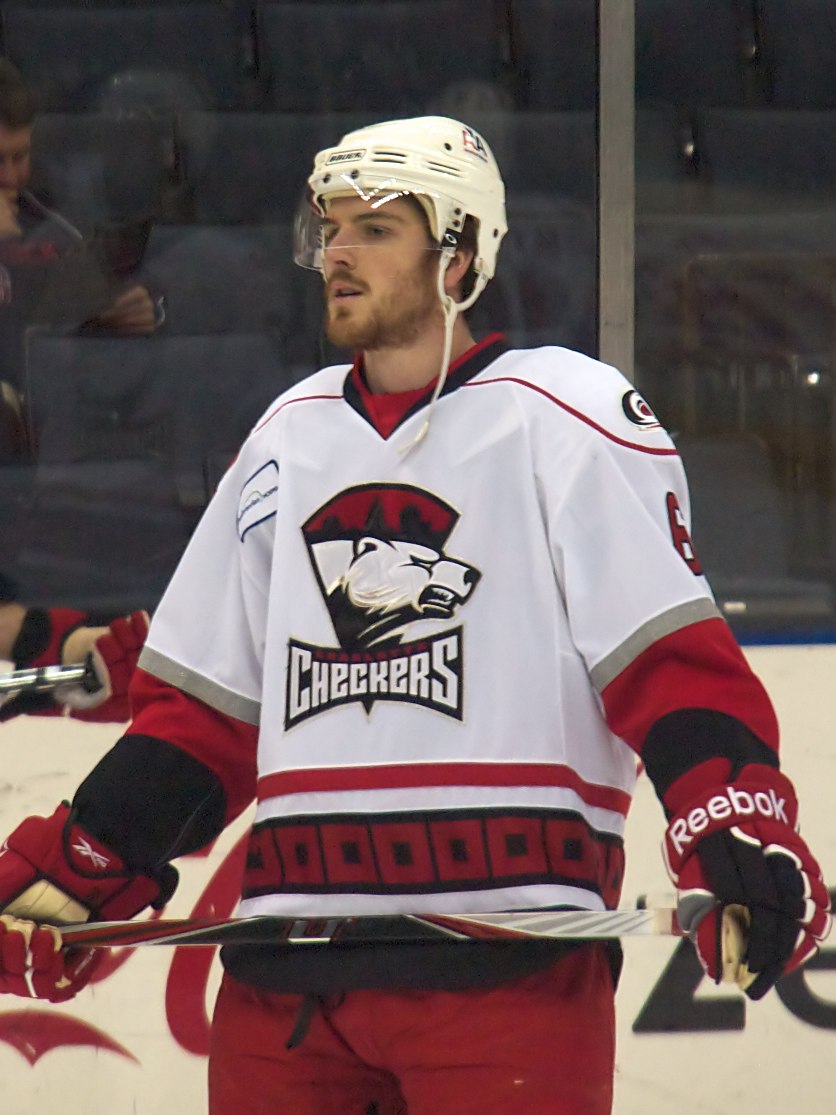
- Born: February 29, 1988 (age 38) Trenton, New Jersey, U.S.
- Height: 6 ft 3 in (191 cm)
- Weight: 190 lb (86 kg; 13 st 8 lb)
- Position: Defense
- Shot: Right
- Played for: New York Rangers; Carolina Hurricanes; Atlant Moscow Oblast; EHC Kloten; HC Lugano; EHC München
- National team: United States
- NHL draft: 21st overall, 2006; New York Rangers
- Playing career: 2007–2020

Robert Sanguinetti (born February 29, 1988) is an American former professional ice hockey defenseman who played for the New York Rangers and Carolina Hurricanes in the National Hockey League (NHL). He was originally drafted 21st overall by the Rangers in the 2006 NHL entry draft.

== Playing career ==
Born in Trenton, New Jersey, Sanguinetti grew up in Lumberton Township, New Jersey. Sanguinetti's peewee team, the New Jersey Rockets, won the 2001 Tier 1 USA National Championship. He played in the 2002 Quebec International Pee-Wee Hockey Tournament with the Philadelphia Flyers minor ice hockey team. He later played hockey at Lawrenceville School for his freshman and sophomore years, leaving school after being drafted.

In the 2006 NHL entry draft, Sanguinetti was selected by the New York Rangers with the 21st pick in the first round. Sanguinetti, who grew up a Ranger fan, has said he tries to model his game after former Ranger great Brian Leetch, and has worn 22 to honor Leetch, who wore number 2.

Sanguinetti had a breakthrough year during the 2006–07 season, finishing second among all Ontario Hockey League (OHL) defensemen in goals scored (23), and tenth with 53 points. The Owen Sound Attack were eliminated in four games in the playoffs, but Sanguinetti played well, with three goals and three assists in the four games. With his team eliminated Sanguinetti was called up to the Rangers' American Hockey League (AHL) affiliate, the Hartford Wolf Pack. In seven regular season games for the team, he put up five assists and had one point in the playoffs. Sanguinetti was signed to his first professional contract in April 2007 by the Rangers. During the 2008 Stanley Cup playoffs, Sanguinetti would greet fans outside the arena and sign autographs.

Sanguinetti was promoted to the Rangers for their game on January 10, 2009, but did not play and was returned to Hartford the following day. In 2009, Sanguinetti was selected for the AHL's all-star game, playing for PlanetUSA, along with Russian teammate Artem Anisimov. Sanguinetti led PlanetUSA in the hardest shot competition.

In the 2009–10 season, Sanguinetti was again selected to the AHL all-star game, and won the fastest skater competition, setting a new AHL record. During the season, he was called up to the Rangers twice, from November 26 to December 1 and from December 16 to December 19. He made his NHL debut on December 27 against the Tampa Bay Lightning, playing 16.14 minutes on 22 shifts. He played a total of 5 games for the Rangers, with no points and four penalty minutes. He took five shots and had an even plus/minus rating.

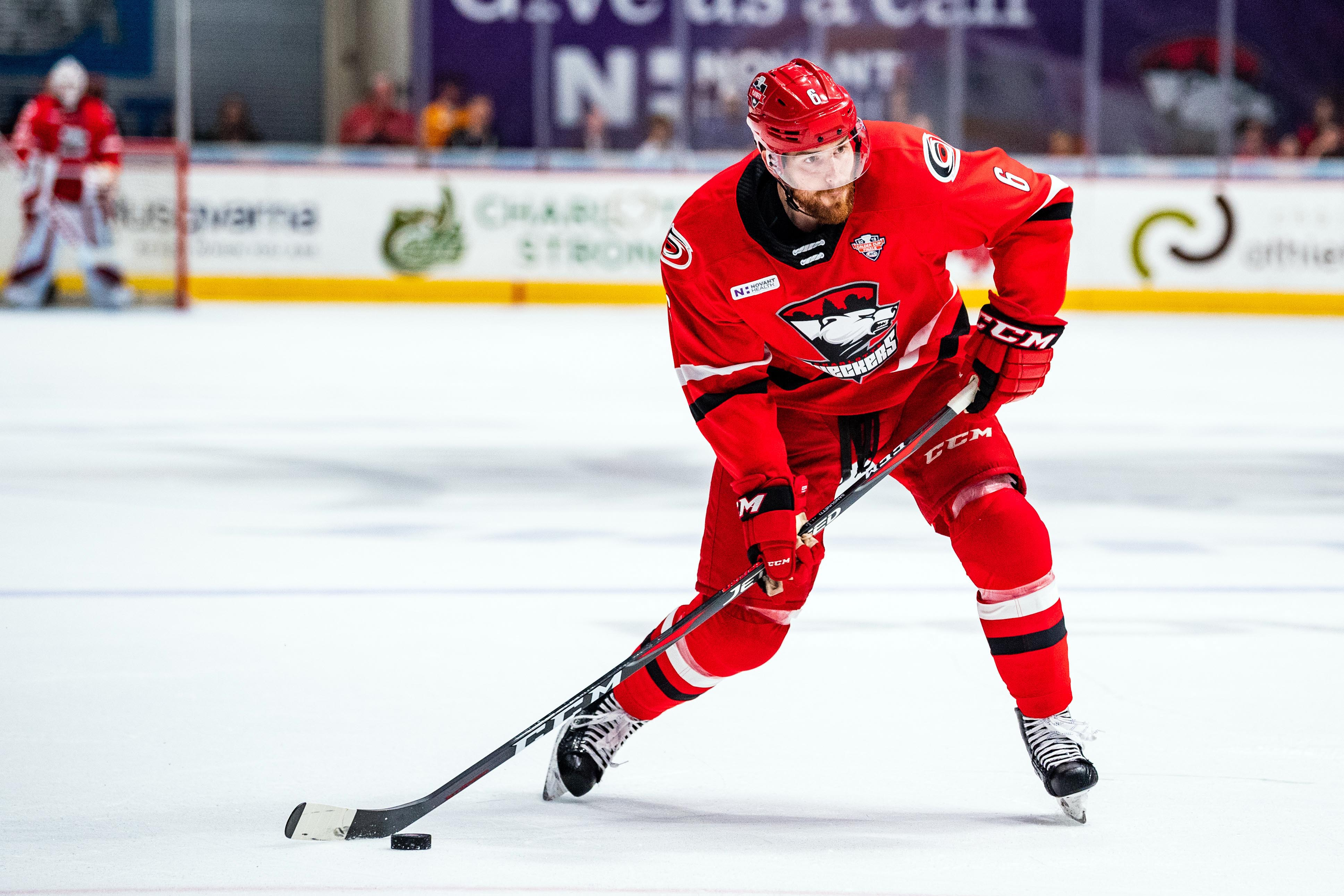
Sanguinetti with the Checkers in 2019.

On June 26, 2010, Sanguinetti was traded to the Carolina Hurricanes in exchange for a second-round draft pick in 2011 and a sixth-round draft pick in 2010.

During the lockout-shortened 2012–13 season, Sanguinetti scored his first NHL goal on February 24, 2013, on the road against the New York Islanders. He played in a career-high 37 games with the Hurricanes recording 6 points.

Sanguinetti and the Carolina Hurricanes were not able to agree to contract terms for the 2013–14 season, so he signed as a free agent in the Russian Kontinental Hockey League (KHL) on a two-year contract with Atlant Moscow Oblast on July 11, 2013.

On July 1, 2014, he signed a one-year free agent contract to return to the NHL with the Vancouver Canucks.

On July 2, 2015, Sanguinetti left the Canucks organization as a free agent and signed a one-year, two-way contract with the Buffalo Sabres. He made 40 appearances for Buffalo's AHL affiliate Rochester Americans in the 2015–16 season, tallying seven goals and eight assists, and did not see any NHL action.

Upon the conclusion of the season, he took up an offer from Switzerland, signing with Kloten of the National League A (NLA) on July 6, 2016. He finished the season with 29 points, including 9 goals in 44 contests, missing a few games with concussion-like symptoms.

On May 24, 2017, Sanguinetti agreed to a one-year contract with Lugano. The contract contained an option for a second year but no NHL-out clause. In the 2017-18 season, Sanguinetti led the blueline in scoring among Lugano, contributing with 11 goals and 29 points in 46 games.

As an unsigned free agent into the mid-point of the 2018–19 season, Sanguinetti returned to his former club, the Charlotte Checkers of the AHL, for the remainder of the campaign on January 1, 2019. He appeared in 10 playoff games, posting 6 points to help the Checkers claim their maiden Calder Cup.

As a free agent, Sanguinetti opted to return abroad, securing a one-year contract with German club, EHC München of the DEL, on September 8, 2019.

== Career statistics ==
=== Regular season and playoffs ===
			Regular season					Playoffs
Season	Team	League	GP	G	A	Pts	PIM	GP	G	A	Pts	PIM
2003–04	Lawrenceville School	HS Prep	26	4	17	21	—	—	—	—	—	—
2003–04	New Jersey Rockets	MJHL	4	0	0	0	0	—	—	—	—	—
2004–05	Owen Sound Attack	OHL	67	4	20	24	12	5	0	2	2	0
2005–06	Owen Sound Attack	OHL	68	14	51	65	44	11	5	10	15	4
2006–07	Owen Sound Attack	OHL	67	23	30	53	48	4	3	3	6	2
2006–07	Hartford Wolf Pack	AHL	5	0	3	3	2	7	0	1	1	2
2007–08	Brampton Battalion	OHL	61	29	41	70	38	5	1	3	4	10
2007–08	Hartford Wolf Pack	AHL	6	0	1	1	2	5	0	0	0	2
2008–09	Hartford Wolf Pack	AHL	78	6	36	42	42	6	1	4	5	6
2009–10	Hartford Wolf Pack	AHL	61	9	29	38	22	—	—	—	—	—
2009–10	New York Rangers	NHL	5	0	0	0	4	—	—	—	—	—
2010–11	Charlotte Checkers	AHL	31	3	12	15	6	10	0	2	2	6
2011–12	Charlotte Checkers	AHL	60	10	40	50	20	—	—	—	—	—
2011–12	Carolina Hurricanes	NHL	3	0	0	0	0	—	—	—	—	—
2012–13	Charlotte Checkers	AHL	36	6	15	21	16	—	—	—	—	—
2012–13	Carolina Hurricanes	NHL	37	2	4	6	4	—	—	—	—	—
2013–14	Atlant Moscow Oblast	KHL	15	2	5	7	2	—	—	—	—	—
2014–15	Utica Comets	AHL	61	16	24	40	16	23	3	11	14	6
2015–16	Rochester Americans	AHL	40	7	8	15	22	—	—	—	—	—
2016–17	EHC Kloten	NLA	38	9	19	28	24	—	—	—	—	—
2017–18	HC Lugano	NL	46	11	18	29	22	17	2	8	10	4
2018–19	Charlotte Checkers	AHL	28	1	3	4	10	10	1	5	6	12
2019–20	EHC Red Bull München	DEL	37	4	17	21	4	—	—	—	—	—
AHL totals			406	58	171	229	158	61	5	23	28	34
NHL totals			45	2	4	6	8	—	—	—	—	—

=== International ===
Year	Team	Event	Result	GP	G	A	Pts	PIM
2008	United States	WJC	4th	6	1	2	3	0
2018	United States	OG	7th	5	0	1	1	2
Junior totals				6	1	2	3	0
Senior totals				5	0	1	1	2

== Awards and honours ==
Award	Year
OHL
Second All-Rookie Team	2005
CHL/NHL Top Prospects Game	2006
Second All-Star Team	2008
AHL
All-Star Game	2009, 2010, 2015
Second All-Star Team	2015
Calder Cup (Charlotte Checkers)	2019

Awards and achievements
Preceded by Marc Staal	New York Rangers first-round draft pick 2006	Succeeded by Alexei Cherepanov
