= Jordan Weal =

Canadian ice hockey player (born 1992)

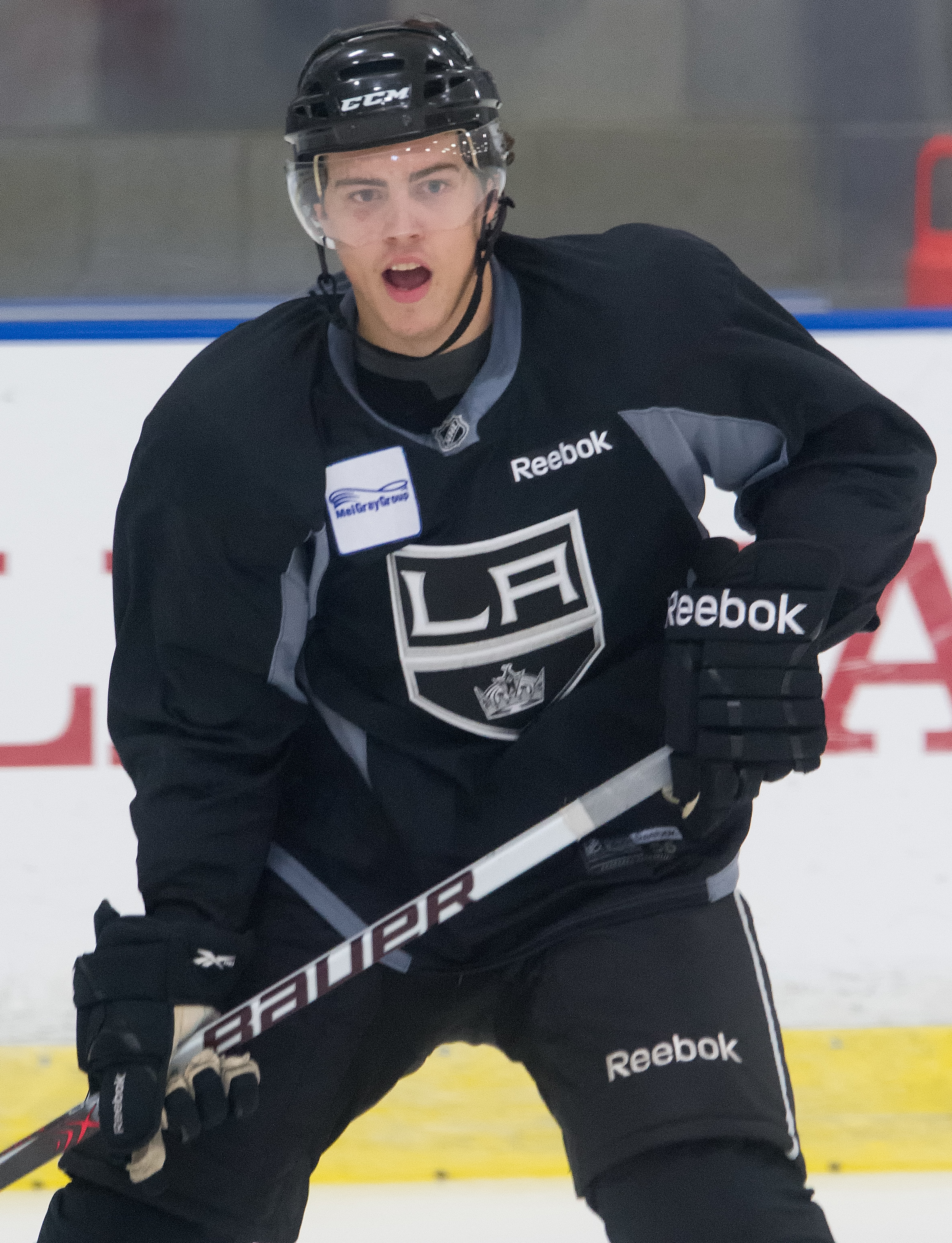
- Weal practicing with the Los Angeles Kings in 2012
- Born: April 15, 1992 (age 34) North Vancouver, British Columbia, Canada
- Height: 5 ft 10 in (178 cm)
- Weight: 179 lb (81 kg; 12 st 11 lb)
- Position: Centre
- Shoots: Right
- KHL team Former teams: Dynamo Moscow; Los Angeles Kings; Philadelphia Flyers; Arizona Coyotes; Montreal Canadiens; Ak Bars Kazan
- National team: Canada
- NHL draft: 70th overall, 2010; Los Angeles Kings
- Playing career: 2011–present

Jordan Weal (born April 15, 1992) is a Canadian professional ice hockey centre for HC Dynamo Moscow in the Kontinental Hockey League (KHL). He was selected in the third round, 70th overall, by the Los Angeles Kings of the National Hockey League (NHL) in the 2010 NHL entry draft. Weal has also previously played for the Philadelphia Flyers, Arizona Coyotes, and Montreal Canadiens.

== Playing career ==
As a youth, Weal played in the 2004 and 2005 Quebec International Pee-Wee Hockey Tournaments with a minor ice hockey team from North Vancouver.

Weal played four years (2008–2012) of major junior hockey with the Regina Pats of the Western Hockey League (WHL), scoring 135 goals and 250 assists for 385 points while earning 186 penalty minutes in 282 games played. During that time, Weal was selected in the third round, 70th overall, by the Los Angeles Kings during the 2010 NHL entry draft. He was recognized for his outstanding play when he was named to the 2011–12 WHL (East) First All-Star Team.

On April 18, 2011, the Kings signed Weal to a three-year entry-level contract. While with the Kings' American Hockey League affiliate, the Manchester Monarchs, Weal won the Calder Cup in 2015, being chosen the playoffs' most valuable player with 10 goals and 12 assists.

On January 6, 2016, Weal was traded by the Kings at the mid-point of the 2015–16 season, along with a third-round pick, to the Philadelphia Flyers, in exchange for Vincent Lecavalier and Luke Schenn.

During the 2016–17 season, Weal scored his first NHL goal against the Colorado Avalanche on February 28, 2017.

In the 2018–19 season, his fourth within the Flyers organization, Weal registered three goals and nine points in 28 games. On January 11, 2019, he was traded to the Arizona Coyotes in exchange for Jacob Graves and a 2019 sixth-round pick. Weal was unable to show his offensive attributes with the Coyotes, contributing just one goal and one assist in 19 games.

On February 25, 2019, the Coyotes traded Weal to the Montreal Canadiens in exchange for Michael Chaput. He performed admirably to close out the season for the Canadiens, recording four goals and six assists in 16 games. On April 26, 2019, the Canadiens re-signed Weal to a two-year, $2.8 million contract.

In May 2021, after spending the entirety of the 2020–21 season with the Canadiens' top affiliate Laval Rocket, Weal elected to sign an optional two-year deal in Russia to join Ak Bars Kazan.

Following the 2021–22 season, having enjoyed a productive tenure with Ak Bars, Weal was traded to fellow KHL club, HC Dynamo Moscow, in exchange for former NHL forward Stanislav Galiev on July 1, 2022.

== International play ==
In January 2022, Weal was selected to play for Team Canada at the 2022 Winter Olympics.

== Career statistics ==
=== Regular season and playoffs ===
			Regular season					Playoffs
Season	Team	League	GP	G	A	Pts	PIM	GP	G	A	Pts	PIM
2007–08	Regina Pats	WHL	3	0	1	1	0	4	0	0	0	0
2008–09	Regina Pats	WHL	65	16	54	70	26	—	—	—	—	—
2009–10	Regina Pats	WHL	72	35	67	102	54	—	—	—	—	—
2010–11	Regina Pats	WHL	72	43	53	96	70	—	—	—	—	—
2010–11	Manchester Monarchs	AHL	7	0	1	1	0	—	—	—	—	—
2011–12	Regina Pats	WHL	70	41	75	116	36	5	1	4	5	0
2011–12	Manchester Monarchs	AHL	2	0	0	0	0	—	—	—	—	—
2012–13	Manchester Monarchs	AHL	63	15	18	33	38	4	0	2	2	4
2013–14	Manchester Monarchs	AHL	73	23	47	70	42	4	0	3	3	2
2014–15	Manchester Monarchs	AHL	73	20	49	69	56	19	10	12	22	16
2015–16	Los Angeles Kings	NHL	10	0	0	0	2	—	—	—	—	—
2015–16	Philadelphia Flyers	NHL	4	0	0	0	0	—	—	—	—	—
2016–17	Lehigh Valley Phantoms	AHL	43	15	32	47	30	—	—	—	—	—
2016–17	Philadelphia Flyers	NHL	23	8	4	12	10	—	—	—	—	—
2017–18	Philadelphia Flyers	NHL	69	8	13	21	12	1	0	0	0	0
2018–19	Philadelphia Flyers	NHL	28	3	6	9	16	—	—	—	—	—
2018–19	Arizona Coyotes	NHL	19	1	1	2	0	—	—	—	—	—
2018–19	Montreal Canadiens	NHL	16	4	6	10	2	—	—	—	—	—
2019–20	Montreal Canadiens	NHL	49	8	7	15	14	2	0	0	0	0
2020–21	Laval Rocket	AHL	34	7	17	24	32	—	—	—	—	—
2021–22	Ak Bars Kazan	KHL	36	12	18	30	20	6	0	2	2	4
2022–23	Dynamo Moscow	KHL	62	14	29	43	62	6	3	3	6	14
2023–24	Dynamo Moscow	KHL	66	30	47	77	30	10	4	5	9	10
2024–25	Dynamo Moscow	KHL	66	15	36	51	40	17	5	6	11	11
2025–26	Dynamo Moscow	KHL	67	14	41	55	51	4	0	1	1	2
NHL totals			218	32	37	69	56	3	0	0	0	0
KHL totals			297	85	171	256	203	43	12	17	29	41

=== International ===
Year	Team	Event	Result	GP	G	A	Pts	PIM
2009	Canada Pacific	U17	2nd place, silver medalist(s)	6	1	5	6	2
2010	Canada	WJC18	7th	6	3	6	9	30
2022	Canada	OG	6th	5	3	2	5	6
Junior totals				12	4	11	15	32
Senior totals				5	3	2	5	6

== Awards and honours ==
Award	Year
WHL
(East) First All-Star Team	2011–12
AHL
Second All-Star Team	2014–15
Jack A. Butterfield Trophy	2014–15
Calder Cup (Manchester Monarchs)	2015
