= Brian O'Neill (ice hockey, born 1988) =

American ice hockey forward (born 1988)

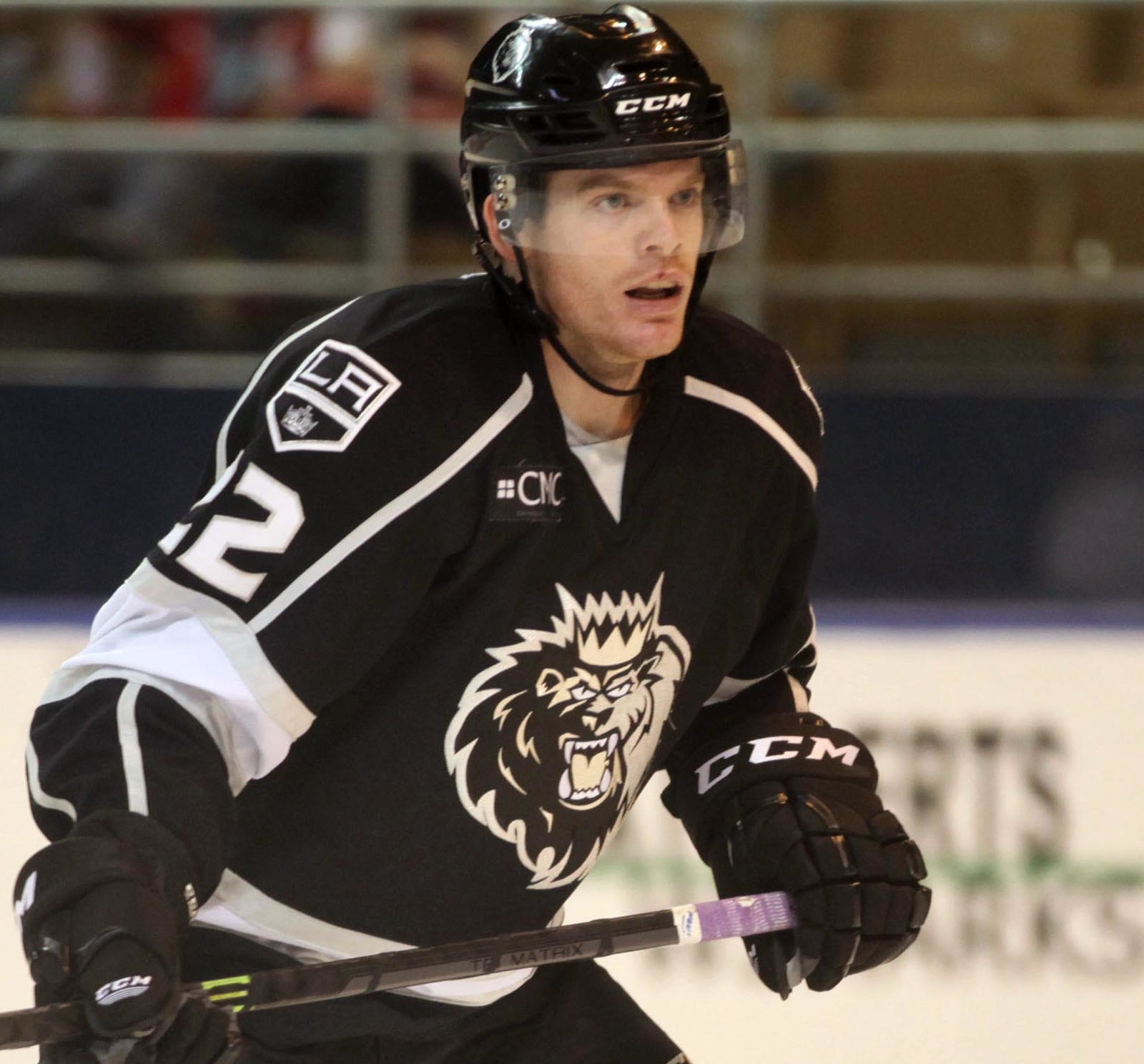
- O'Neill with the Manchester Monarchs in 2014
- Born: June 1, 1988 (age 38) Yardley, Pennsylvania, U.S.
- Height: 5 ft 9 in (175 cm)
- Weight: 175 lb (79 kg; 12 st 7 lb)
- Position: Forward
- Shoots: Right
- SHL team Former teams: Luleå HF; New Jersey Devils; Jokerit
- National team: United States
- NHL draft: Undrafted
- Playing career: 2012–present

Brian O'Neill (born June 1, 1988) is an American professional ice hockey forward for Luleå HF of the Swedish Hockey League (SHL)

== Playing career ==
Undrafted, O'Neill played collegiate hockey with Yale University of the ECAC before signing a one-year entry-level contract with the Los Angeles Kings after his senior year on March 15, 2012. and was assigned to the Manchester Monarchs.

In the 2014–15 season, his third full season within the Kings organization, O'Neill was assigned to continue to play with the Manchester Monarchs of the AHL. He enjoyed a breakout year offensively with the Monarchs, leading the team and the league with 58 assists and 80 points in 71 games to be awarded the Les Cunningham Award as the AHL's most valuable player. In the post-season, O'Neill continued his offensive pace in recording 10 goals and 20 points to help the Monarchs dominate the league and capture the Calder Cup in their final season in the AHL.

Before the 2015–16 season, O'Neill attended the Kings' training camp and participated in the pre-season. O'Neill was unable to earn a roster spot in Los Angeles, and as a result, on the eve of the season, on October 6, 2015, the Kings traded O'Neill to the New Jersey Devils in return for a conditional 7th-round pick. O'Neill made his NHL debut with the Devils on October 10, 2015, against the Washington Capitals. He played 22 games in the NHL for the Devils that season and also made 42 appearances for their AHL affiliate Albany Devils.

On May 20, 2016, he signed a deal with Helsinki-based club Jokerit of the Kontinental Hockey League (KHL). In December 2020, O'Neill, dubbed "Mr. Helsinki", signed a new three-year contract with Jokerit.

O'Neill was an offensive catalyst for six years in Jokerit before the club withdrew from the KHL during the 2021–22 season due to the Russian invasion of Ukraine.

As a free agent, O'Neill opted to continue his career abroad, agreeing to a two-year contract with Swiss club EV Zug of the NL on May 6, 2022.

== Career statistics ==
=== Regular season and playoffs ===
			Regular season					Playoffs
Season	Team	League	GP	G	A	Pts	PIM	GP	G	A	Pts	PIM
2004–05	Germantown Academy	HS-PA	2	4	1	5		—	—	—	—	—
2005–06	Philadelphia Jr. Flyers 18U AAA	AYHL	22	11	30	41	37	—	—	—	—	—
2006–07	Philadelphia Jr. Flyers 18U AAA	AYHL	12	8	17	25	27	—	—	—	—	—
2007–08	Chicago Steel	USHL	60	23	38	61	40	7	3	2	5	10
2008–09	Yale University	ECAC	33	12	14	26	37	—	—	—	—	—
2009–10	Yale University	ECAC	34	16	29	45	20	—	—	—	—	—
2010–11	Yale University	ECAC	36	20	26	46	39	—	—	—	—	—
2011–12	Yale University	ECAC	35	21	25	46	26	—	—	—	—	—
2011–12	Manchester Monarchs	AHL	12	1	1	2	4	4	0	1	1	6
2012–13	Manchester Monarchs	AHL	49	3	12	15	18	4	1	0	1	2
2013–14	Manchester Monarchs	AHL	60	26	21	47	39	—	—	—	—	—
2014–15	Manchester Monarchs	AHL	71	22	58	80	55	19	10	10	20	12
2015–16	New Jersey Devils	NHL	22	0	2	2	8	—	—	—	—	—
2015–16	Albany Devils	AHL	42	13	19	32	10	9	1	4	5	6
2016–17	Jokerit	KHL	55	16	20	36	49	4	1	1	2	4
2017–18	Jokerit	KHL	44	14	16	30	40	11	2	1	3	6
2018–19	Jokerit	KHL	62	13	45	58	30	6	1	2	3	6
2019–20	Jokerit	KHL	56	19	29	48	18	6	0	6	6	2
2020–21	Jokerit	KHL	53	12	42	54	12	4	0	1	1	2
2021–22	Jokerit	KHL	41	9	33	42	24	—	—	—	—	—
2022–23	EV Zug	NLA	50	14	28	42	20	—	—	—	—	—
2023–24	EV Zug	NLA	29	10	11	21	10	—	—	—	—	—
2024–25	Luleå HF	SHL	51	13	25	38	14	17	6	10	16	6
NHL totals			22	0	2	2	8	—	—	—	—	—
KHL totals			311	83	185	268	173	31	4	11	15	20

=== International ===
Year	Team	Event	Result	GP	G	A	Pts	PIM
2018	United States	OG	7th	5	1	3	4	0
2022	United States	OG	5th	4	1	2	3	0
Senior totals				9	2	5	7	0

== Awards and honors ==
Award	Year
College
All-ECAC Hockey Rookie Team	2008–09
All-ECAC Hockey First Team	2010–11, 2011–12
ECAC Hockey All-Tournament Team	2011
AHCA East Second-Team All-American	2011–12
AHL
Les Cunningham Award	2014–15
John B. Sollenberger Trophy	2014–15
Second All-Star Team	2014–15
Calder Cup champion	2015
SHL
Le Mat Trophy (Luleå HF)	2025
