= 2014–15 AHL season =

- League: American Hockey League
- Sport: Ice hockey
- Duration: October 10, 2014 - April 19, 2015

Regular season
- Macgregor Kilpatrick Trophy: Manchester Monarchs
- Season MVP: Brian O'Neill
- Top scorer: Brian O'Neill

Playoffs
- Playoffs MVP: Jordan Weal

Calder Cup
- Champions: Manchester Monarchs
- Runners-up: Utica Comets

AHL seasons
- 2013–14 2015–16

The 2014–15 AHL season was the 79th season of the American Hockey League. The regular season began in October 2014 and ended in April 2015. The 2015 Calder Cup playoffs followed the conclusion of the regular season.

== Team and NHL affiliation changes ==
=== Relocations ===
- The Adirondack Phantoms relocated to Allentown, Pennsylvania, to play as the Lehigh Valley Phantoms.
- The Abbotsford Heat relocated to Glens Falls, New York, after the City of Abbotsford terminated their lease agreement with the Calgary Flames. The team became the Adirondack Flames and played out of the Glens Falls Civic Center.

On July 9, 2014, the President of the AHL announced a realignment for the 2014–15 season. Eastern Conference changes include the Lehigh Valley Phantoms relocation and swapping to the East Division from the Northeast Division with the Syracuse Crunch. Western Conference changes include the Lake Erie Monsters moving from the North Division to the Midwest Division, and the Iowa Wild moving from the Midwest to the West Division due to the Adirondack Flames relocation in to the North Division

=== Rule changes ===
- Overtime was extended to seven minutes. Following the first whistle beyond the first three minutes, both teams are reduced further from four to three men on the ice.
- Shootouts switched to the NHL format of three skaters a side.
- If a goaltender deliberately knocks the goal out of place during a breakaway, the goaltender shall be ejected from the game, and the backup goaltender will be required to face a penalty shot against any player of the opposing team's choosing. This rule was imposed midseason after Bridgeport Sound Tigers goaltender David Leggio knocked his goal out of place during a 2-on-0 breakaway, determining (correctly) that the penalty shot he would face under then-current rules would have been easier to defend than the 2-on-0 breakaway he was facing.

== Final standings ==
y– indicates team clinched division and a playoff spot
x– indicates team clinched a playoff spot
e– indicates team was eliminated from playoff contention

=== Eastern Conference ===
Atlantic Division	GP	W	L	OTL	SOL	Pts	GF	GA
y–Manchester Monarchs (LAK)	76	50	17	6	3	109	241	176
x–Providence Bruins (BOS)	76	41	26	7	2	91	209	185
x–Worcester Sharks (SJS)	76	41	29	4	2	88	224	198
x–Portland Pirates (ARI)	76	39	28	7	2	87	203	190
e–St. John's IceCaps (WPG)	76	32	33	9	2	75	183	235

Northeast Division	GP	W	L	OTL	SOL	Pts	GF	GA
y–Hartford Wolf Pack (NYR)	76	43	24	5	4	95	221	214
x–Syracuse Crunch (TBL)	76	41	25	10	0	92	218	219
e–Springfield Falcons (CBJ)	76	38	28	8	2	86	192	209
e–Albany Devils (NJD)	76	37	28	5	6	85	199	201
e–Bridgeport Sound Tigers (NYI)	76	28	40	7	1	64	213	246

East Division	GP	W	L	OTL	SOL	Pts	GF	GA
y–Hershey Bears (WSH)	76	46	22	5	3	100	218	181
x–Wilkes-Barre/Scranton Penguins (PIT)	76	45	24	3	4	97	212	163
e–Binghamton Senators (OTT)	76	34	34	7	1	76	242	258
e–Lehigh Valley Phantoms (PHI)	76	33	35	7	1	74	194	237
e–Norfolk Admirals (ANA)	76	27	39	6	4	64	168	219

=== Western Conference ===
West Division	GP	W	L	OTL	SOL	Pts	GF	GA
y–San Antonio Rampage (FLA)	76	45	23	7	1	98	248	222
x–Texas Stars (DAL)	76	40	22	13	1	94	242	216
x–Oklahoma City Barons (EDM)	76	41	27	5	3	90	224	212
e–Charlotte Checkers (CAR)	76	31	38	6	1	69	172	231
e–Iowa Wild (MIN)	76	23	49	2	2	50	172	245

Midwest Division	GP	W	L	OTL	SOL	Pts	GF	GA
y–Grand Rapids Griffins (DET)	76	46	22	6	2	100	249	185
x–Rockford IceHogs (CHI)	76	46	23	5	2	99	222	180
x–Chicago Wolves (STL)	76	40	29	6	1	87	210	198
e–Lake Erie Monsters (COL)	76	35	29	8	4	82	211	240
e–Milwaukee Admirals (NSH)	76	33	28	8	7	81	206	218

North Division	GP	W	L	OTL	SOL	Pts	GF	GA
y–Utica Comets (VAN)	76	47	20	7	2	103	219	182
x–Toronto Marlies (TOR)	76	40	27	9	0	89	207	203
e–Hamilton Bulldogs (MTL)	76	34	29	12	1	81	201	208
e–Adirondack Flames (CGY)	76	35	33	6	2	78	233	240
e–Rochester Americans (BUF)	76	29	41	5	1	64	209	251

== Statistical leaders ==
=== Leading skaters ===
The following players are sorted by points, then goals. Updated as of April 18, 2015.

GP = Games played; G = Goals; A = Assists; Pts = Points; +/– = P Plus–minus; PIM = Penalty minutes

Player	Team	GP	G	A	Pts	PIM
Brian O'Neill	Manchester Monarchs	71	22	58	80	55
Andy Miele	Grand Rapids Griffins	71	26	44	70	42
Jordan Weal	Manchester Monarchs	73	20	49	69	56
Jonathan Marchessault	Syracuse Crunch	68	24	43	67	38
Chris Bourque	Hartford Wolf Pack	73	29	37	66	66
Shane Prince	Binghamton Senators	72	28	37	65	31
Andrew Agozzino	Lake Erie Monsters	74	30	34	64	55
Dustin Jeffrey	Bridgeport Sound Tigers	69	25	39	64	22
Travis Morin	Texas Stars	63	22	41	63	40
Teemu Pulkkinen	Grand Rapids Griffins	46	34	27	61	30

=== Leading goaltenders ===
The following goaltenders with a minimum 1500 minutes played lead the league in goals against average. Updated as of April 19, 2015.

GP = Games played; TOI = Time on ice (in minutes); SA = Shots against; GA = Goals against; SO = Shutouts; GAA = Goals against average; SV% = Save percentage; W = Wins; L = Losses; OT = Overtime/shootout loss

Player	Team	GP	TOI	SA	GA	SO	GAA	SV%	W	L	OT
Matt Murray	Wilkes-Barre/Scranton Penguins	40	2320:49	1029	61	12	1.58	.941	25	10	3
Jacob Markstrom	Utica Comets	32	1879:36	895	59	5	1.88	.934	22	7	2
Anton Forsberg	Springfield Falcons	30	1763:51	808	59	3	2.01	.927	20	8	1
Jeremy Smith	Providence Bruins	39	2277:53	1156	78	3	2.05	.933	22	11	5
Aaron Dell	Worcester Sharks	26	1544:08	728	53	4	2.06	.927	15	8	2

== Calder Cup playoffs ==
Conference Quarterfinals	Conference Semifinals
1	Manchester	3
8	Portland	2
1	Manchester	4
4	W-B/Scranton	1
2	Hershey	3
7	Worcester	1
Eastern Conference
3	Hartford	3
6	Providence	2
2	Hershey	2
3	Hartford	4
4	W-B/Scranton	3
5	Syracuse	0
1	Utica	3
8	Chicago	2
1	Utica	4
6	Oklahoma City	3
2	Grand Rapids	3
7	Toronto	2
Western Conference
3	San Antonio	0
6	Oklahoma City	3
2	Grand Rapids	4
4	Rockford	1
4	Rockford	3
5	Texas	0

Conference Finals
1	Manchester	4
3	Hartford	0
1	Utica	4
2	Grand Rapids	2

Calder Cup Finals
E1	Manchester	4
W1	Utica	1

== AHL awards ==
Calder Cup : Manchester Monarchs
Les Cunningham Award : Brian O'Neill, Manchester
John B. Sollenberger Trophy : Brian O'Neill, Manchester
Willie Marshall Award : Teemu Pulkkinen, Grand Rapids
Dudley "Red" Garrett Memorial Award : Matt Murray, Wilkes-Barre/Scranton
Eddie Shore Award : Chris Wideman, Binghamton
Aldege "Baz" Bastien Memorial Award : Matt Murray, Wilkes-Barre/Scranton
Harry "Hap" Holmes Memorial Award : Matt Murray & Jeff Zatkoff, Wilkes-Barre/Scranton
Louis A. R. Pieri Memorial Award : Mike Stothers, Manchester
Fred T. Hunt Memorial Award : Jeff Hoggan, Grand Rapids
Yanick Dupre Memorial Award : Kyle Hagel, Charlotte
Jack A. Butterfield Trophy : Jordan Weal, Manchester
Richard F. Canning Trophy : Manchester Monarchs
Robert W. Clarke Trophy : Utica Comets
Macgregor Kilpatrick Trophy: Manchester Monarchs
Frank Mathers Trophy: Hershey Bears
Norman R. "Bud" Poile Trophy: Grand Rapids Griffins
Emile Francis Trophy : Manchester Monarchs
F. G. "Teddy" Oke Trophy: Hartford Wolf Pack
Sam Pollock Trophy: Utica Comets
John D. Chick Trophy: San Antonio Rampage
James C. Hendy Memorial Award: Vance Lederman, Syracuse
Thomas Ebright Memorial Award: Michael Andlauer, Hamilton
James H. Ellery Memorial Awards: Brendan Burke, Utica
Ken McKenzie Award: Brian Coe, Wilkes-Barre/Scranton
Michael Condon Memorial Award: Mike Emanatian

=== All-Star teams ===
First All-Star Team

- Matt Murray (G)
- Brad Hunt (D)
- Chris Wideman (D)
- Chris Bourque (LW)
- Andy Miele (C)
- Teemu Pulkkinen (RW)

Second All-Star Team

- Jacob Markstrom (G)
- Colin Miller (D)
- Bobby Sanguinetti (D)
- Shane Prince (LW)
- Jordan Weal (C)
- Brian O'Neill (RW)

All-Rookie Team

- Matt Murray (G)
- Ville Pokka (D)
- Ryan Pulock (D)
- Viktor Arvidsson (F)
- Connor Brown (F)
- Charles Hudon (F)

== See also ==
- List of AHL seasons
- 2014 in ice hockey
- 2015 in ice hockey

Preceded by 2013–14	AHL seasons	Succeeded by 2015–16
