= 2013–14 Oklahoma City Barons season =

2013–14 Oklahoma City Barons
- Division: 3rd West Division
- Conference: 8th Western Conference
- 2013–14 record: 36–29–2–9 (83 pts)
- Home record: 23–12–1–2
- Road record: 13–17–1–7
- Goals for: 239
- Goals against: 256

Team information
- General manager: Bill Scott
- Coach: Todd Nelson
- Assistant coach: Gerry Fleming; Rocky Thompson
- Arena: Cox Convention Center

Team leaders
- Goals: Matthew Ford (25)
- Assists: Brad Hunt (39)
- Points: Roman Horak (55)
- Penalty minutes: Steve Pinizzotto (183)
- Plus/minus: (+) Mark Arcobello (+11) (−) C.J. Stretch (−17)
- Wins: Richard Bachman (26)
- Goals against average: Frans Tuohimaa (1.85)

The 2013–14 Oklahoma City Barons season is the franchise's fourth season in the American Hockey League, which began on October 4, 2013.

== Off-season ==
Oklahoma City remained in the same division after an American Hockey League realignment in the summer of 2013, but it was renamed from the South Division to the West Division. Todd Nelson started his fourth year as Barons head coach in the 2013–14 season, despite rumors that he may depart following his disappointment with being passed over as the Edmonton Oilers coach after Ralph Krueger's departure. Nelson has two years remaining on his contract and said, but said he may explore job opportunities at other organizations in the future. The Barons saw several departures in the off-season, such as forwards Philippe Cornet, Darcy Hordichuk, Kristiāns Pelšs, and Chris VandeVelde; defensemen Randy Jones and Jordan Henry; and veteran goaltender Yann Danis. Center Mark Arcobello, an AHL-All Star and the team's all-time leading scorer, made the Edmonton roster. Winger Curtis Hamilton remained on the team, but injured his knee in a practice after the first game of the season and would not start right away. Newcomers to the team included forwards Travis Ewanyk, Matthew Ford, Austin Fyten, Ryan Hamilton, Ryan Jones, Kale Kessy, Philip Larsen, Andrew Miller, Nicholas Tremblay, and Derek Nesbitt; defensemen Martin Gernat, Brad Hunt, Oscar Klefbom and David Musil; and goaltender Richard Bachman, who was backup goal for NHL's Dallas Stars for the last two seasons. Winger Linus Omark, who had previously played for the Barons and Oilers but spent last season with the Swiss team EV Zug, returned to a one-year agreement with Oklahoma City. The new Oklahoma City roster included a mix of young and veteran forwards, as well as a young core of defensemen, with six of the starting eight between ages 20 and 22, as well as Hunt and Taylor Fedun, both of whom were 25.

After starting their training camp on September 23, the Barons lost both of their two preseason games in overtime, starting with a 3–2 loss to the Texas Stars on September 27. Gernat and Joel Broda scored for Oklahoma City, but forward Mike Heddenn got the game-winner 58 seconds into the extra period. The Barons lost a preseason game against the San Antonio Rampage on September 28, falling 2–1 after San Antonio center Jared Gomes tied the game with 12.9 seconds left in regulation, then scored the game's lone shootout goal against Oklahoma City goalie Ty Rimmer.

2013–14 Preseason Game Log: 0–0–1–1

#	Date	Visitor	Score	Home	OT	Decision	Record
2	September 27	Oklahoma City	3–2	Texas	OT	Bunz	0–0–1–0
3	September 28	San Antonio	2–1	Oklahoma City	SO	Rimmer	0–0–1–1

== Regular season ==
=== October ===
The Barons started the season with three straight losses, including back-to-back defeats against the Charlotte Checkers, and a 1–0 shutout loss to Iowa Wild. Oklahoma City has lost all four home openers since the franchise began. The Barons were forced to make last-minute line changes when Ryan Hamilton was recalled to Edmonton just hours before the first game. Despite the losses, Bachman recorded a 2.36 goals against average and .920 game percentage over the first three games. Oklahoma City notched their first win of the season on October 13 with a 4–2 game against Iowa. Nesbitt had two goals, and the Barons scored two power play goals within 46 seconds in the third period. Iowa forward Jason Zucker received a 10-minute match penalty and two-game suspension for an illegal check to the head of Omark. Oklahoma defeated the Texas Stars on October 15 in their first home victory of the season. Omark, who had yet to score in the season thus far, scored the game-winner in overtime. The game brought the team's penalty kill percentage to 93.8, the second-best in the league at that point.

Over the next two weeks, the Oklahoma City roster underwent multiple changes due to repeated Edmonton Oilers injuries. Bachman, Ryan Jones, team captain Anton Lander and wingers Ben Eager, Tyler Pitlick were all recalled in that time, as were defensemen Fedun, Denis Grebeshkov and Corey Potter, who were returned to the Barons before the month was out. Center Ryan Martindale was also sidelined until mid-November due to arthroscopic knee surgery. Omark scored two goals and two assists in a 4–3 victory over the Abbotsford Heat on October 18, with Bachman making 41 saves, including 20 during a three-goal Heat rally in the final period. Two power play goals in that game brought the Barons' man advantage percentage to 28 percent, the third-best team in the league.

Abbotsford defeated Oklahoma City 2–1 the next day, forcing overtime after scoring with 38 seconds left in regulation. Miller failed to score on a penalty shot against goalie Reto Berra. Bachman, in his first shootout in two years, allowed two of four goals, while only Nesbitt scored for the Barons. Bachman nevertheless retained a 1.99 GAA and .934 save percentage. After five home games, the team's average attendance of about 2,600 marked a franchise low, and the second-lowest in the league for the season. The Barons lost two of their next three, including a 5–4 win over San Antonio on October 25 in which Omark scored four goals, one of which a successful penalty shot against goaltender Dov Grumet-Morris. It was Omark's second career game with four or more goals.

=== November ===
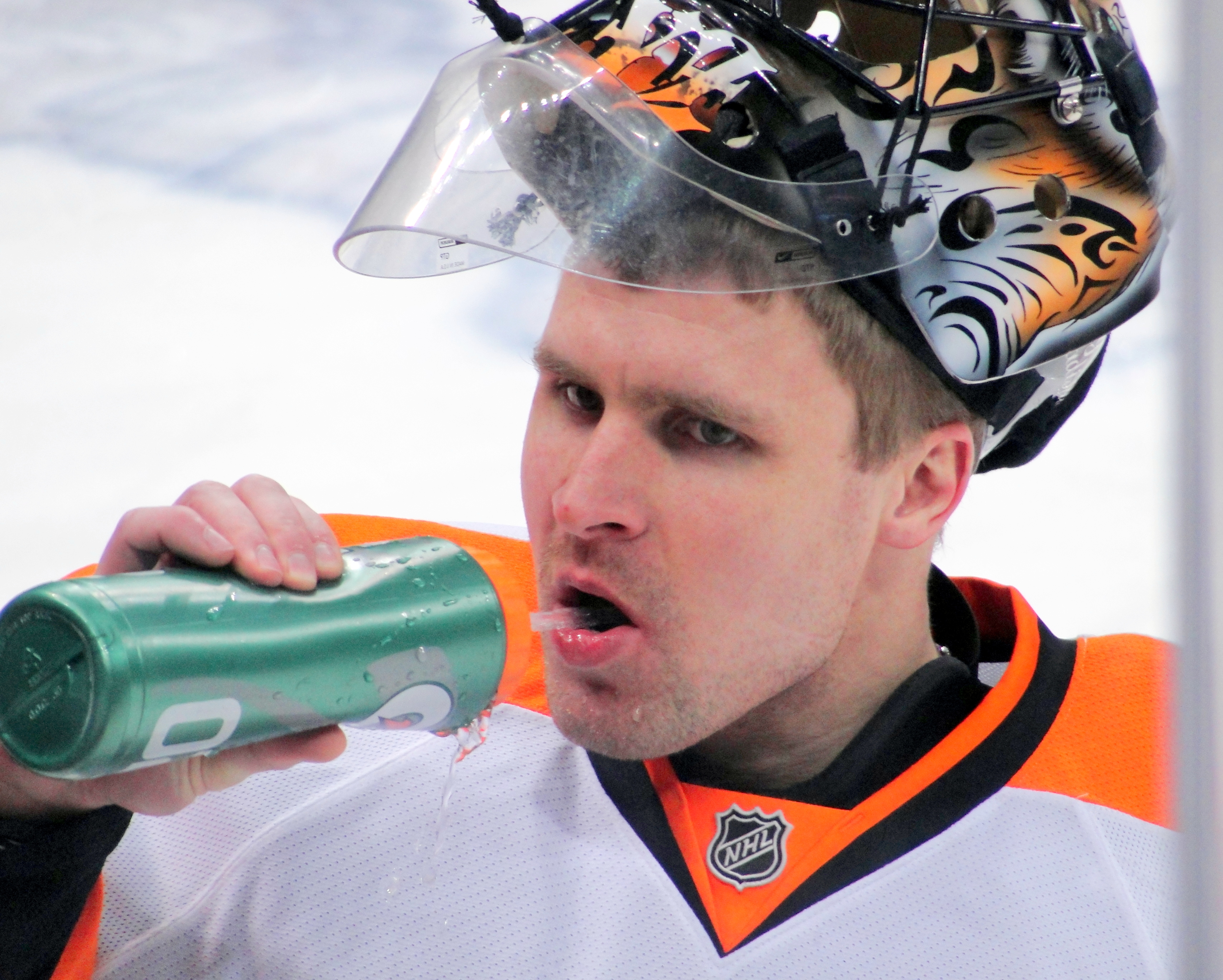
Goaltender Ilya Bryzgalov made his AHL debut with the Barons on November 15.

As a result of the continued Edmonton injuries trickle-down effect, the Barons started November with few veterans and nine skaters who had played for the ECHL last season. Oklahoma City suffered their second shutout loss of the season on November 1 with a 6–0 loss to the Chicago Wolves, one of the worst losses in the franchise's four-year history. They responded with a 4–2 victory over Chicago the next day. Goalie Olivier Roy, who was pulled from the net after allowing five goals in the first 21 shots in the first game, made 31 saves in the rematch. Lander was reassigned to the Barons after Ryan Hamilton was reactivated by the Oilers. Oklahoma City struggled with inconsistency problems due to the turnover with Edmonton: they had scored an average of about four goals in their five wins of the season thus far, but only about 1.1 in their seven losses. The Oilers signed a goaltender Ilya Bryzgalov to a $1.7 million contract on November 8, and he began practicing with the Barons. Goalie Tyler Bunz made 34 saves in his first AHL start against San Antonio on November 9, but the team fell 3–2 after the Rampage scored two shootout goals and only Ryan Hamilton scored for Oklahoma City. The Barons defeated San Antonio by the same score on November 12, with Omark getting the game-winner after sliding the pick behind his back and between his legs before scoring against goalie Jacob Markström. The goal generated a great deal of attention, becoming the most-viewed video on the Oklahoma City Barons website with over 75,000 views in the first 24 hours, and making ESPN SportsCenter's top ten plays, a rarity for the AHL.

Bryzgalov made his AHL debut on November 15 in a 5–4 loss against the Abbotsford. He allowing five goals on 24 shots, including two goals within 59 seconds of each other. Center Ben Street recorded a hat-trick against Oklahoma City, with two of his three goals scored 27 seconds apart. Bryzgalov fared better the next day, making 25 saves in a 4–1 win over the Heat. Forward C. J. Stretch scored two goals for the Barons to help end Abbotsford's nine-game winning streak, the longest in the league. Arcobello was returned to the Barons by Edmonton, who in turn recalled both Bryzgalov and Klefbom. Oklahoma City started a five-game road trip with a 6–1 loss against San Antonio, with Martin Marinčin scoring the team's only goal in 37 shots. Bunz was replaced by goaltender Laurent Brossoit, acquired in a recent trade from the Calgary Flame, after allowing the first four goals against.

== Schedule and results ==
2013–14 Game Log – Regular season

October: 4–5–0–1 (Home: 2–2–0–1; Road: 2–3–0–0)
#	Date	Visitor	Score	Home	OT	Decision	Attendance	Record	Pts	Gamesheet
1	October 4	Charlotte	3–2	Oklahoma City		Bachman	3,008	0–1–0–0	0	Gamesheet
2	October 5	Charlotte	3–2	Oklahoma City		Bachman	2,682	0–2–0–0	0	Gamesheet
3	October 12	Oklahoma City	0–1	Iowa		Bachman	10,213	0–3–0–0	0	Gamesheet
4	October 13	Oklahoma City	4–2	Iowa		Roy	4,217	1–3–0–0	2	Gamesheet
5	October 15	Texas	1–2	Oklahoma City	OT	Bachman	1,805	2–3–0–0	4	Gamesheet
6	October 18	Abbotsford	3–4	Oklahoma City		Bachman	2,680	3–3–0–0	6	Gamesheet
7	October 19	Abbotsford	2–1	Oklahoma City	SO	Bachman	2,783	3–3–0–1	7	Gamesheet
8	October 23	Oklahoma City	1–4	Texas		Bachman	4,488	3–4–0–1	7	Gamesheet
9	October 25	Oklahoma City	5–4	San Antonio		Bachman	6,237	4–4–0–1	9	Gamesheet
10	October 26	Oklahoma City	2–4	San Antonio		Roy	5,113	4–5–0–1	9	Gamesheet

November: 5–5–0–2 (Home: 4–2–0–0; Road: 1–3–0–2)
#	Date	Visitor	Score	Home	OT	Decision	Attendance	Record	Pts	Gamesheet
11	November 1	Chicago	6–0	Oklahoma City		Roy	2,328	4–6–0–1	9	Gamesheet
12	November 2	Chicago	2–4	Oklahoma City		Roy	2,626	5–6–0–1	11	Gamesheet
13	November 9	Oklahoma City	2–3	San Antonio	SO	Bunz	6,440	5–6–0–2	12	Gamesheet
14	November 12	San Antonio	2–3	Oklahoma City		Bunz	6,771	6–6–0–2	14	Gamesheet
15	November 15	Abbotsford	5–4	Oklahoma City		Bryzgalov	3,098	6–7–0–2	14	Gamesheet
16	November 16	Abbotsford	1–4	Oklahoma City		Bryzgalov	3,163	7–7–0–2	16	Gamesheet
17	November 19	Oklahoma City	1–6	San Antonio		Bunz	12,127	7–8–0–2	16	Gamesheet
18	November 21	Oklahoma City	6–1	Lake Erie		Brossoit	3,277	8–8–0–2	18	Gamesheet
19	November 22	Oklahoma City	3–5	Lake Erie		Brossoit	8,770	8–9–0–2	18	Gamesheet
20	November 27	Oklahoma City	1–2	Texas		LaBarbera	5,206	8–10–0–2	18	Gamesheet
21	November 29	Oklahoma City	2–3	San Antonio	SO	LaBarbera	7,037	8–10–0–3	19	Gamesheet
22	November 30	San Antonio	1–3	Oklahoma City		Brossoit	3,271	9–10–0–3	21	Gamesheet

December: 2–7–1–2 (Home: 1–2–1–0; Road: 1–5–0–2)
#	Date	Visitor	Score	Home	OT	Decision	Attendance	Record	Pts	Gamesheet
23	December 3	Texas	5–4	Oklahoma City		Brossoit	2,393	9–11–0–3	21	Gamesheet
24	December 6	Oklahoma City	2–5	Milwaukee		Brossoit	4,427	9–12–0–3	21	Gamesheet
25	December 7	Oklahoma City	5–2	Chicago		Rimmer	8,049	10–12–0–3	23	Gamesheet
26	December 8	Oklahoma City	4–5	Chicago	SO	Rimmer	4,684	10–12–0–4	24	Gamesheet
27	December 12	Oklahoma City	0–4	Milwaukee		Bachman	2,627	10–13–0–4	24	Gamesheet
28	December 13	Oklahoma City	3–4	Rockford		Brossoit	3,359	10–14–0–4	24	Gamesheet
29	December 14	Oklahoma City	4–5	Rockford	SO	Bachman	4,738	10–14–0–5	25	Gamesheet
30	December 20	Texas	0–2	Oklahoma City		Bachman	2,808	11–14–0–5	27	Gamesheet
31	December 21	Texas	7–2	Oklahoma City		Bachman	5,400	11–15–0–5	27	Gamesheet
32	December 27	Oklahoma City	1–5	Abbotsford		Bachman	2,931	11–16–0–5	27	Gamesheet
33	December 28	Oklahoma City	2–4	Abbotsford		Bachman	2,149	11–17–0–5	27	Gamesheet
34	December 31	Texas	6–5	Oklahoma City	OT	Bachman	3,804	11–17–1–5	28	Gamesheet

January: 6–5–0–0 (Home: 5–3–0–0; Road: 1–2–0–0)
#	Date	Visitor	Score	Home	OT	Decision	Attendance	Record	Pts	Gamesheet
35	January 3	Oklahoma City	5–2	San Antonio		Pickard	6,618	12–17–1–5	30	Gamesheet
36	January 4	San Antonio	3–5	Oklahoma City		Bachman	3,288	13–17–1–5	32	Gamesheet
37	January 8	Utica	2–3	Oklahoma City	OT	Bachman	1,873	14–17–1–5	34	Gamesheet
38	January 10	Charlotte	5–2	Oklahoma City		Pickard	2,967	14–18–1–5	34	Gamesheet
39	January 11	Charlotte	2–1	Oklahoma City		Bachman	3,267	14–19–1–5	34	Gamesheet
40	January 17	Rochester	4–3	Oklahoma City		Bachman	2,664	14–20–1–5	34	Gamesheet
41	January 18	Milwaukee	1–2	Oklahoma City		Bachman	6,196	15–20–1–5	36	Gamesheet
42	January 19	Milwaukee	4–5	Oklahoma City	SO	Bachman	3,032	16–20–1–5	38	Gamesheet
43	January 23	Oklahoma City	0–4	Charlotte		Bachman	5,916	16–21–1–5	38	Gamesheet
44	January 24	Oklahoma City	3–9	Charlotte		Pickard	8,160	16–22–1–5	38	Gamesheet
45	January 30	Toronto	3–5	Oklahoma City		Bachman	2,576	17–22–1–5	40	Gamesheet

February: 7–2–0–1 (Home: 2–0–0–1; Road: 5–2–0–0)
#	Date	Visitor	Score	Home	OT	Decision	Attendance	Record	Pts	Gamesheet
46	February 2	Oklahoma City	7–4	Texas		Bachman	3,916	18–22–1–5	42	Gamesheet
47	February 4	Oklahoma City	5–2	Texas		Bachman	4,256	19–22–1–5	44	Gamesheet
48	February 7	Oklahoma City	8–5	Charlotte		Bachman	8,189	20–22–1–5	46	Gamesheet
49	February 9	Oklahoma City	4–3	Charlotte	OT	Bachman	8,168	21–22–1–5	48	Gamesheet
50	February 14	Lake Erie	1–2	Oklahoma City		Bachman	3,067	22–22–1–5	50	Gamesheet
51	February 15	Lake Erie	5–4	Oklahoma City	SO	Bachman	4,524	22–22–1–6	51	Gamesheet
52	February 21	Oklahoma City	4–2	Grand Rapids		Bachman	10,834	23–22–1–6	53	Gamesheet
53	February 22	Oklahoma City	3–4	Grand Rapids		Bachman	8,254	23–23–1–6	53	Gamesheet
54	February 23	Oklahoma City	1–4	Toronto		Bachman	4,290	23–24–1–6	53	Gamesheet
55	February 28	Rockford	4–5	Oklahoma City	OT	Bachman	3,853	24–24–1–6	55	Gamesheet

March: 6–3–1–3 (Home: 4–2–0–0; Road: 2–0–1–3)
#	Date	Visitor	Score	Home	OT	Decision	Attendance	Record	Pts	Gamesheet
56	March 1	Rockford	4–5	Oklahoma City		Bachman	3,158	25–24–1–6	57	Gamesheet
57	March 2	San Antonio	5–6	Oklahoma City		Bunz	2,576	26–24–1–6	59	Gamesheet
58	March 5	Oklahoma City	3–4	Utica	SO	Bachman	2,808	26–24–1–7	60	Gamesheet
59	March 7	Oklahoma City	2–1	Hamilton		Bachman	4,407	27–24–1–7	62	Gamesheet
60	March 9	Oklahoma City	4–5	Rochester	OT	Bachman	5,202	28–24–1–7	64	Gamesheet
61	March 11	San Antonio	2–5	Oklahoma City		Bachman	2,591	29–24–1–7	66	Gamesheet
62	March 14	Grand Rapids	3–2	Oklahoma City		Bachman	3,294	29–25–1–7	66	Gamesheet
63	March 15	Grand Rapids	4–3	Oklahoma City		Bachman	4,494	29–26–1–7	66	Gamesheet
64	March 21	Oklahoma City	3–4	Texas	OT	Bachman	5,808	29–26–2–7	67	Gamesheet
65	March 22	Oklahoma City	3–5	Texas		Brossoit	6,439	29–27–2–7	67	Gamesheet
66	March 25	San Antonio	1–2	Oklahoma City		Bachman	3,070	30–27–2–7	69	Gamesheet
67	March 29	Oklahoma City	2–3	Charlotte	SO	Bachman	8,232	30–27–2–8	70	Gamesheet
68	March 30	Oklahoma City	4–5	Charlotte	SO	Bachman	8,011	30–27–2–9	71	Gamesheet

April: 6–2–0–0 (Home: 5–1–0–0; Road: 1–1–0–0)
#	Date	Visitor	Score	Home	OT	Decision	Attendance	Record	Pts	Gamesheet
69	April 2	Hamilton	4–5	Oklahoma City		Bachman	2,852	31–27–2–9	73	Gamesheet
70	April 5	Charlotte	0–1	Oklahoma City		Bachman	3,957	32–27–2–9	75	Gamesheet
71	April 6	Charlotte	4–6	Oklahoma City		Bachman	3,061	33–27–2–9	77	Gamesheet
72	April 11	Oklahoma City	2–3	Abbotsford		Bachman	3,403	33–28–2–9	77	Gamesheet
73	April 13	Oklahoma City	5–4	Abbotsford	SO	Bachman	5,065	34–28–2–9	79	Gamesheet
74	April 16	Texas	2–1	Oklahoma City		Bachman	3,067	34–29–2–9	79	Gamesheet
75	April 18	Iowa	3–4	Oklahoma City	OT	Bachman	4,344	35–29–2–9	81	Gamesheet
76	April 19	Iowa	2–3	Oklahoma City	SO	Tuohimaa	4,837	36–29–2–9	83	Gamesheet

Legend: Win (2 points) Loss (0 points) Overtime/shootout loss (1-point)

== Player statistics ==
=== Skaters ===
Note: GP = Games played; G = Goals; A = Assists; Pts = Points; +/− = Plus/minus; PIM = Penalty minutes
Updated as of November 20, 2013

Regular season
Player	GP	G	A	Pts	+/-	PIM
Linus Omark	17	10	5	15	−8	10
Roman Horák	4	1	4	5	0	2
Derek Nesbitt	17	5	5	10	−6	12
Matthew Ford	16	4	5	9	−2	22
C. J. Stretch	17	3	6	9	−1	10
Anton Lander	12	3	5	8	−2	4
Andrew Miller^{*}	16	2	6	8	−2	4
Philip Larsen^{‡}	7	1	6	7	−4	4
Taylor Fedun	15	1	5	6	−2	16
Martin Marinčin	15	1	3	4	0	2
Brad Hunt	11	0	4	4	1	4
Denis Grebeshkov	10	2	1	3	−1	4
Ryan Martindale	4	1	2	3	−1	4
Tyler Pitlick^{‡}	7	1	2	3	0	2
Martin Gernát^{*}	7	0	3	3	−2	2
Austin Fyten^{*}	12	0	3	3	3	8
Ryan Jones^{‡}	4	2	0	2	−2	2
Ryan Hamilton	5	1	1	2	0	4
Joel Broda^{‡}	8	1	1	2	−3	8
Kyle Kessy^{*}	17	1	1	2	−4	18
Ben Eager	10	1	0	1	−2	24
Mario Lamoureux^{‡}	3	0	1	1	−1	4
Corey Potter^{‡}	6	0	1	1	−5	4
David Musil^{*}	7	0	1	1	−1	4
Brandon Davidson	13	0	1	1	−8	14
Oscar Klefbom^{*}	13	0	1	1	−6	2
Alex Lavoie^{‡}	1	0	0	0	0	0
Nicolas Tremblay^{‡}	1	0	0	0	0	2
Justin Maylan^{‡}	4	0	0	0	−1	2
Erick Lizon	10	0	0	0	−1	9
Travis Ewanyk^{*}	17	0	0	0	−4	17

^{†}Denotes player spent time with another team before joining team. Stats reflect time with the team only.
^{‡}Left the team mid-season
^{*}Rookie

=== Goaltenders ===
Note: GP = Games played; TOI = Time on ice; W = Wins; L = Losses; GA = Goals against; GAA = Goals against average; SV = Saves; SA = Shots against; SV% = Save percentage; SO = Shutouts; G = Goals; A = Assists; PIM = Penalty minutes
Updated as of November 20, 2013

Regular season
Player	GP	TOI	W	L	GA	GAA	SV	SA	SV%	SO	G	A	PIM
Richard Bachman^{‡}	8	480:17	3	5	19	2.37	235	254	.925	0	0	0	0
Ilya Bryzgalov^{‡}	2	118:57	1	1	6	3.03	44	50	.880	0	0	0	0
Tyler Bunz^{*}	4	171:34	1	2	9	3.15	96	105	.914	0	0	1	0
Olivier Roy	4	218:40	2	2	12	3.19	105	117	.897	4	0	0	0
Laurent Brossoit^{*}	3	127:38	0	1	11	5.17	52	63	.825	0	0	0	0
Totals		1,117:06	7	11	57	3.06	532	589	.903	0	0	1	0

^{‡}Left the team mid-season
^{*}Rookie

== Milestones ==
Player	Milestone	Reached
Andrew Miller	1st AHL Goal	October 15, 2013
Tyler Bunz	1st AHL Game	November 9, 2013
Ilya Bryzgalov	1st AHL Game	November 15, 2013
Ilya Bryzgalov	1st AHL Win	November 16, 2013
