= 2010 WCHA men's ice hockey tournament =

2010 WCHA Men's ice hockey tournament
- 2010 WCHA Final Five logo
- Dates: March 12–20, 2010
- Teams: 10
- Finals site: Xcel Energy Center; St. Paul, Minnesota
- Champions: North Dakota (15th title)
- Winning coach: Dave Hakstol (3rd title)
- WCHA Men's Ice Hockey Tournaments

The 2010 WCHA Men's Ice Hockey Tournament was the 51st conference playoff in league history and 56th season where a WCHA champion was crowned. The 2010 tournament was played between March 12 and March 20, 2010, at five conference arenas and the Xcel Energy Center in St. Paul, Minnesota. By winning the tournament, North Dakota received the Broadmoor Trophy and was awarded the Western Collegiate Hockey Association's automatic bid to the 2010 NCAA Division I Men's Ice Hockey Tournament.

== Format ==
The first round of the postseason tournament featured a best-of-three games format. All ten conference teams participated in the tournament. Teams were seeded No. 1 through No. 10 according to their final conference standing, with a tiebreaker system used to seed teams with an identical number of points accumulated. The top five seeded teams each earned home ice and host one of the lower seeded teams.

The winners of the first round series advanced to the Xcel Energy Center for the WCHA Final Five, the collective name for the quarterfinal, semifinal, and championship rounds. The Final Five used a single-elimination format. Teams were re-seeded No. 1 through No. 5 according to the final regular season conference standings, with the top three teams automatically advancing to the semifinals.

=== Conference standings ===
Note: GP = Games played; W = Wins; L = Losses; T = Ties; PTS = Points; GF = Goals For; GA = Goals Against

2009–10 Western Collegiate Hockey Association standings
	Conference							Overall					
	GP	W	L	T	PTS	GF	GA	GP	W	L	T	GF	GA
#4 Denver†	28	19	5	4	42	92	65	41	27	10	4	133	99
#2 Wisconsin	28	17	8	3	37	109	76	43	28	11	4	171	111
#5 St. Cloud State	28	15	9	4	34	90	77	43	24	14	5	138	122
Minnesota–Duluth	28	16	11	1	33	90	77	40	22	17	1	126	109
#7 North Dakota*	28	15	10	3	33	89	61	43	25	13	5	140	91
Colorado College	28	12	13	3	27	88	85	39	19	17	3	123	113
Minnesota	28	12	14	2	26	80	76	39	18	19	2	106	110
Minnesota State	28	9	17	2	20	75	92	39	16	20	3	110	112
Alaska–Anchorage	28	9	17	2	20	66	106	36	11	23	2	87	141
Michigan Tech	28	4	24	0	8	59	118	36	5	30	1	74	148
Championship: North Dakota † indicates conference regular season champion * indicates conference tournament champion Final rankings: USA Today/USA Hockey Magazine Top 15 Poll

== Bracket ==
Teams are reseeded after the first round

First round March 12–14
1	Denver	2	4	—
10	Michigan Tech	1	2	—
2	Wisconsin	4	7	—
9	Alaska Anchorage	1	2	—
3	St. Cloud State	4	3	3*
8	Minnesota State	5*	2	2
4	North Dakota	6	2	4
7	Minnesota	0	3	1
5	Minnesota-Duluth	3*	3	4
6	Colorado College	2	5	0

Quarterfinal; March 18
5	Minnesota-Duluth	0
4	North Dakota	2

Semifinals; March 19
1	Denver	3
4	North Dakota	4
2	Wisconsin	0
3	St. Cloud State	2

Championship; March 20
4	North Dakota	5
3	St. Cloud State	3

Note: * denotes overtime periods

=== First round ===
==== (1) Denver vs. (10) Michigan Tech ====
March 12	Denver	2 – 1	Michigan Tech	Magness Arena	Recap
Jesse Martin (Maiani, Ostrow) - 00:37		First period	15:31 - Cark Nielsen (Pietila, MacLeod)
Brian Gifford (Shore, Knowlton) - 15:45		Second period	No scoring
No scoring		Third period	No scoring
Marc Cheverie ( 19 saves / 20 shots )		Goalie stats	Josh Robinson ( 38 saves / 40 shots )

March 13	Denver	4 – 2	Michigan Tech	Magness Arena	Recap
Jesse Martin (Ostrow) - 6:22		First period	11:48 - pp - Ryan Bunger (Cousens, Gwilliam)
John Lee (Donovan, Ruegsegger) - 18:24; Joe Colborne (Rakhshani) - sh - 19:54		Second period	No scoring
Kyle Ostrow (Martin, Maiani) - 10:53		Third period	8:24 - Peter Rohn (Gwilliam)
Marc Cheverie ( 26 saves / 28 shots )		Goalie stats	Josh Robinson ( 30 saves / 34 shots )

Denver wins series 2–0

==== (2) Wisconsin vs. (9) Alaska-Anchorage ====
March 12	Wisconsin	4 – 1	Alaska-Anchorage	Kohl Center	Recap
Michael Davies (Stepan) - 18:10		First period	No scoring
Aaron Bendickson (Ramage, B. Smith) - 00:47; Jake Gardiner (Geoffrion) - sh - 12:03; Craig Smith (Street, Goloubef) - 16:03		Second period	No scoring
No scoring		Third period	19:13 - Craig Parkinson (Grant, Backstrom)
Scott Gudmandson ( 27 saves / 28 shots )		Goalie stats	Josh Olthuis ( 25 saves / 29 shots )

March 13	Wisconsin	7 – 2	Alaska-Anchorage	Kohl Center	Recap
Blake Geoffrion (C. Smith, Bohmbach) - 3:32; Michael Davies (Stepan, Street) - 18:46		First period	19:36 - Trevor Hunt (Lafranchise, Naslund)
Derek Stepan (B. Smith) - pp - 18:11; Justin Schultz (Geoffrion, B. Smith) - pp - 19:22		Second period	15:27 - Curtis Leinweber (Currier, Bruijsten)
Aaron Bendickson (Stepan, Street) - 13:06; Aaron Bendickson (Bohmbach, Mitchell) - 13:18; Blake Geoffrion (B. Smith, Davies) - 18:38		Third period	No scoring
Scott Gudmandson ( 33 saves / 35 shots )		Goalie stats	Bryce Christianson ( 27 saves / 34 shots )

Wisconsin wins series 2–0

==== (3) St. Cloud State vs. (8) Minnesota State ====
March 12	St. Cloud State	4 – 5	OT	Minnesota State	National Hockey Center	Recap
Garrett Raboin - pp - 05:56		First period		No scoring
Travis Novak - sh - 09:52; Ben Hanowski - 13:08		Second period		19:32 - pp - Evan Mosey
Tony Mosey - 11:21		Third period		10:38 - Andrew Sackrison; 13:39 - sh - Kael Mouillerat; 19:59 - Geoff Irwin
No scoring		First overtime period		00:20 - Kael Mouillerat
Dan Dunn ( 30 saves / 35 shots )		Goalie stats		Phil Cook ( 27 saves / 31 shots )

March 13	St. Cloud State	3 – 2	Minnesota State	National Hockey Center	Recap
No scoring		First period	No scoring
No scoring		Second period	6:39 - Geoff Irwin; 16:39 - "pp" - Ben Youds
David Eddy - 0:52; Garrett Roe - 6:31; Garrett Roe - 6:51		Third period	No scoring
Mike Lee ( 31 saves / 33 shots )		Goalie stats	Phil Cook ( 20 saves / 23 shots )

March 14	St. Cloud State	3 – 2	OT	Minnesota State	National Hockey Center
No scoring		First period		No scoring
Garrett Roe - 16:06		Second period		11:14 - Tyler Pitlick
Jason Wiley - 10:20		Third period		12:29 - Garrett Raboin
Drew LaBlanc - "pp" - 3:21		First overtime period		No scoring
Mike Lee ( 27 saves / 29 shots )		Goalie stats		Phil Cook ( 23 saves / 26 shots )

St. Cloud State wins series 2-1

==== (4) North Dakota vs. (7) Minnesota ====
March 12	North Dakota	6 – 0	Minnesota	Ralph Engelstad Arena	Recap
Danny Kristo - 01:39; Chris VandeVeide - sh - 16:07; Brad Malone - 19:05		First period	No scoring
Matt Frattin - 18:50		Second period	No scoring
Mario Lamoureux - 07:46; Matt Frattin - 15:33		Third period	No scoring
Brad Eidsness ( 27 saves / 27 shots )		Goalie stats	Alex Kangas ( 21 saves / 25 shots ) Kent Patterson ( 7 saves / 9 shots )

March 13	North Dakota	2 – 3	Minnesota	Ralph Engelstad Arena	Recap
No scoring		First period	17:20 - "pp" Mike Hoeffel
Corbin Knight - 7:03		Second period	No scoring
Matt Frattin - 10:44		Third period	12:10 - "pp" - Jacob Cepis; 12:58 - Seth Helgeson; 19:59 - "eng" - Jordan Schroeder
Brad Eidsness ( 22 saves / 25 shots )		Goalie stats	Alex Kangas ( 41 saves / 43 shots )

March 14	North Dakota	4 – 1	Minnesota	Ralph Engelstad Arena
Ben Blood - "pp" - 4:59		First period	11:10 - Jake Hansen
Jason Gregoire - 16:18		Second period
Matt Frattin - "pp" - 11:24; Brett Hextall - "eng" - 19:17		Third period
Brad Eidsness ( 18 saves / 19 shots )		Goalie stats	Alex Kangas ( 25 saves / 29 shots )

North Dakota wins series 2-1

==== (5) Minnesota-Duluth vs. (6) Colorado College ====
March 12	Minnesota-Duluth	3 – 2	OT	Colorado College	Duluth Entertainment Convention Center	Recap
Rob Bordson - 08:48		First period		09:50 - Nick Dineen
Rob Bordson - pp - 12:38		Second period		06:04 - Nick Dineen
No scoring		Third period		No scoring
Mike Connolly - 06:42		First overtime period		No scoring
Kenny Reiter ( 19 saves / 21 shots )		Goalie stats		Joe Howe ( 32 saves / 35 shots )

March 13	Minnesota-Duluth	3 – 5	Colorado College	Duluth Entertainment Convention Center	Recap
Mike Connolly - "pp" - 2:37		First period	No scoring
Jordan Fulton - "pp" - 7:19; Travis Oleksuk - "pp" - 10:56		Second period	2:33 - Tyler Johnson; 7:19 - Addison DeBoer; 15:52 - "pp" - Mike Testwuide
No scoring		Third period	5:17 - Scott Winkler; 19:45 - "eng" - Nick Dinneen
Kenny Reiter ( 32 saves / 37 shots )		Goalie stats	Joe Howe ( 24 saves / 26 shots )

March 14	Minnesota-Duluth	4 – 0	Colorado College	Duluth Entertainment Convention Center
Kyle Schmidt - 2:39		First period	No scoring
Brady Lamb - 5:26; Rob Bordson - "pp" - 19:43		Second period	No scoring
Mike Connolly - 0:46		Third period	No scoring
Kenny Reiter ( 15 saves / 15 shots )		Goalie stats	Joe Howe ( 13 saves / 17 shots )

Minnesota-Duluth wins series 2-1

=== Quarterfinal ===
==== (4) North Dakota vs. (5) Minnesota-Duluth ====
March 18	Minnesota-Duluth	0 – 2	North Dakota	Xcel Energy Center	Recap
No Scoring		First period	No scoring
No scoring		Second period	No scoring
No scoring		Third period	12:22 - "sh" - Jason Gregoire; 18:01 - Evan Trupp
Kenny Reiter ( 30 saves / 30 shots )		Goalie stats	Brad Eidsness ( 22 saves / 22 shots )

=== Semifinals ===
==== (1) Denver vs. (4) North Dakota ====
March 19	Denver	3 – 4	North Dakota	Xcel Energy Center	Recap
No scoring		First period	7:59 - "pp" - Chris VandeVelde
Matt Donovan - 18:25		Second period	4:41 - Evan Trupp; 19:13 - "pp" - Evan Trupp
Brad Malone - "pp" - 4:15; Chris Knowlton - "sh" - 19:23		Third period	13:59 - Chris Knowlton
Marc Cheverie ( 20 saves / 24 shots )		Goalie stats	Brad Eidsness ( 23 saves / 26 shots )

==== (2) Wisconsin vs. (3) St. Cloud State ====
March 19	Wisconsin	0 – 2	St. Cloud State	Xcel Energy Center	Recap
No scoring		First period	No scoring
No scoring		Second period	19:07 - "pp" - Ryan Lasch
No scoring		Third period	19:04 - "eng" - Travis Novak
Scott Gudmandson ( 20 saves / 22 shots )		Goalie stats	Mike Lee ( 37 saves / 37 shots )

=== Third place ===
==== (2) Wisconsin vs. (1) Denver ====
March 20	Wisconsin	6 – 3	Denver	Xcel Energy Center	Recap
Ben Street - 2:21; Derek Stepan - 4:58; Blake Geoffrion - pp - 11:08		First period	No scoring
Blake Geoffrion - 8:54; Sean Dolan - 11:30		Second period	0:25 - pp - Rhett Rakhshani
Michael Davies - 16:16		Third period	4:40 - pp - Jesse Martin; 6:22 - Nate Dewhurst
Scott Gudmandson ( 33 saves / 36 shots )		Goalie stats	Marc Cheverie ( 8 saves / 11 shots ) Adam Murray ( 34 saves / 37 shots )

=== Championship ===
==== (3) St. Cloud State vs. (4) North Dakota ====
March 20	St. Cloud State	3 – 5	North Dakota	Xcel Energy Center	Recap
Garrett Raboin - 0:40; David Eddy - 0:55		First period	5:59 - "pp" - Corban Knight; 17:06 - Brad Malone
David Eddy - 16:46		Second period	5:22 - Danny Kristo (ice hockey); 6:05 - Chris VandeVelde
No scoring		Third period	19:19 - "eng" - Matt Frattin
Mike Lee ( 23 saves / 27 shots ) Dan Dunn ( 11 saves / 11 shots )		Goalie stats	Brad Eidsness ( 29 saves / 32 shots )

== Tournament awards ==
=== All-Tournament Team ===
- F Derrick Lapoint (North Dakota)
- F Tony Mosey (St. Cloud State)
- F Chris VandeVelde (North Dakota)
- D Ben Blood (North Dakota)
- D Garrett Raboin (St. Cloud State)
- G Brad Eidsness (North Dakota)

=== MVP ===
Evan Trupp, (North Dakota)
