= David Eddy =

David Eddy may refer to:

- David Eddy (badminton), British retired badminton player
- David Eddy (ice hockey) (born 1990), Canadian ice hockey player
- David M. Eddy (born 1941), American medical doctor
