= Oscar Klefbom =

Swedish ice hockey player (born 1993)

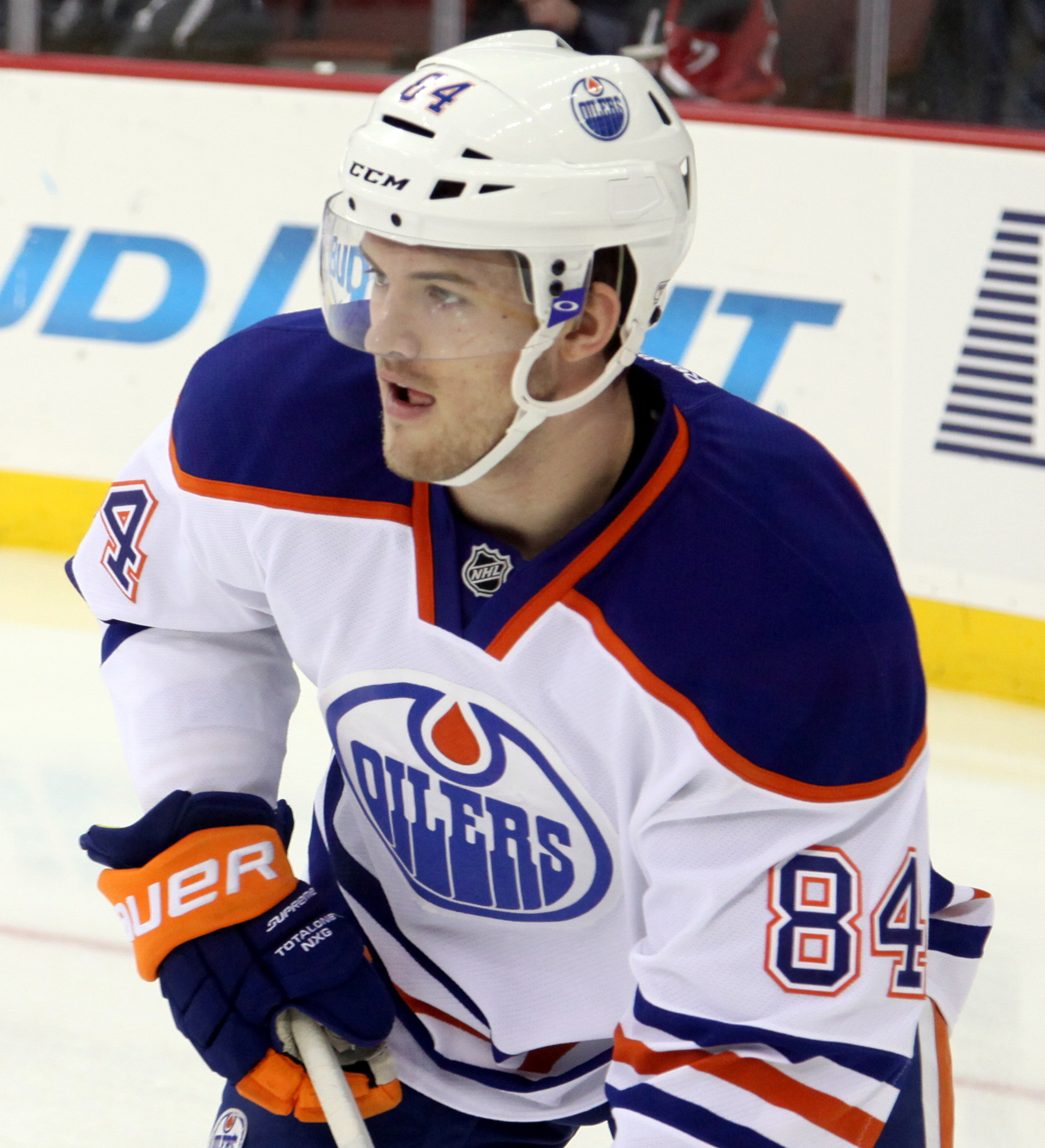
- Klefbom with the Edmonton Oilers in 2015
- Born: 20 July 1993 (age 33) Karlstad, Sweden
- Height: 6 ft 3 in (191 cm)
- Weight: 215 lb (98 kg; 15 st 5 lb)
- Position: Defence
- Shot: Left
- Played for: Färjestad BK; Edmonton Oilers
- National team: Sweden
- NHL draft: 19th overall, 2011; Edmonton Oilers
- Playing career: 2010–2024

Oscar Anders Klefbom (born 20 July 1993) is a Swedish former professional ice hockey defenceman. He last played for the Edmonton Oilers of the National Hockey League (NHL). He was selected 19th overall in the 2011 NHL entry draft by the Oilers. Klefbom was born in Karlstad, Sweden, and grew up in Hammarö.

== Early life ==
Klefbom was born on 20 July 1993, in Karlstad, Sweden to school-teacher Håkan.

== Playing career ==
Growing up in Sweden, Klefbom played within the Färjestad BK organizations U18 and Swedish Hockey League (SHL) teams. During his tenure with the Färjestad BK, Klefbom was named captain of the Swedish under 18 team but was not a mainstay on their SHL lineup. While competing in 23 SHL games during the 2010–11 season, Klefbom scored one goal and two points as the team won the league championship. Upon concluding the playoffs, Klefbom was drafted 19th overall by the Edmonton Oilers in the 2011 NHL entry draft.

Following the draft, Klefbom returned to Färjestad BK for the 2011–12 season where he declined offensively. He spent the majority of the season on their fourth pairing while averaging 13:43 per game. Although Klefbom finished the season with two points through 33 games, he was given increased responsibilities during their post-season berth. During the playoffs, he averaged 19:33 per game while spending regular time with Färjestad's top-four pairings. At the conclusion of the season, Klefbom signed a three-year entry-level contract with the Oilers and considered coming to North America for the 2012–13 campaign. He eventually chose to remain in Sweden due to a promise of increased ice time.

In his third season with Färjestad BK, Klefbom began strong and earned time on their top pairing with either Chris Lee or Ville Lajunen. However, his promising season was cut short due to a season-ending shoulder injury that was the result of a crash into the boards during a game on 9 October. At the time of his injury, Klefbom had recorded a career-best three assists through 10 games. Following the surgery, Klefbom traveled to Edmonton for two weeks to work with the organization and determine his recovery period. Klefbom had recovered enough from the surgery by June to participate in the Oilers' development camp alongside 36 other prospects.

=== North American play ===
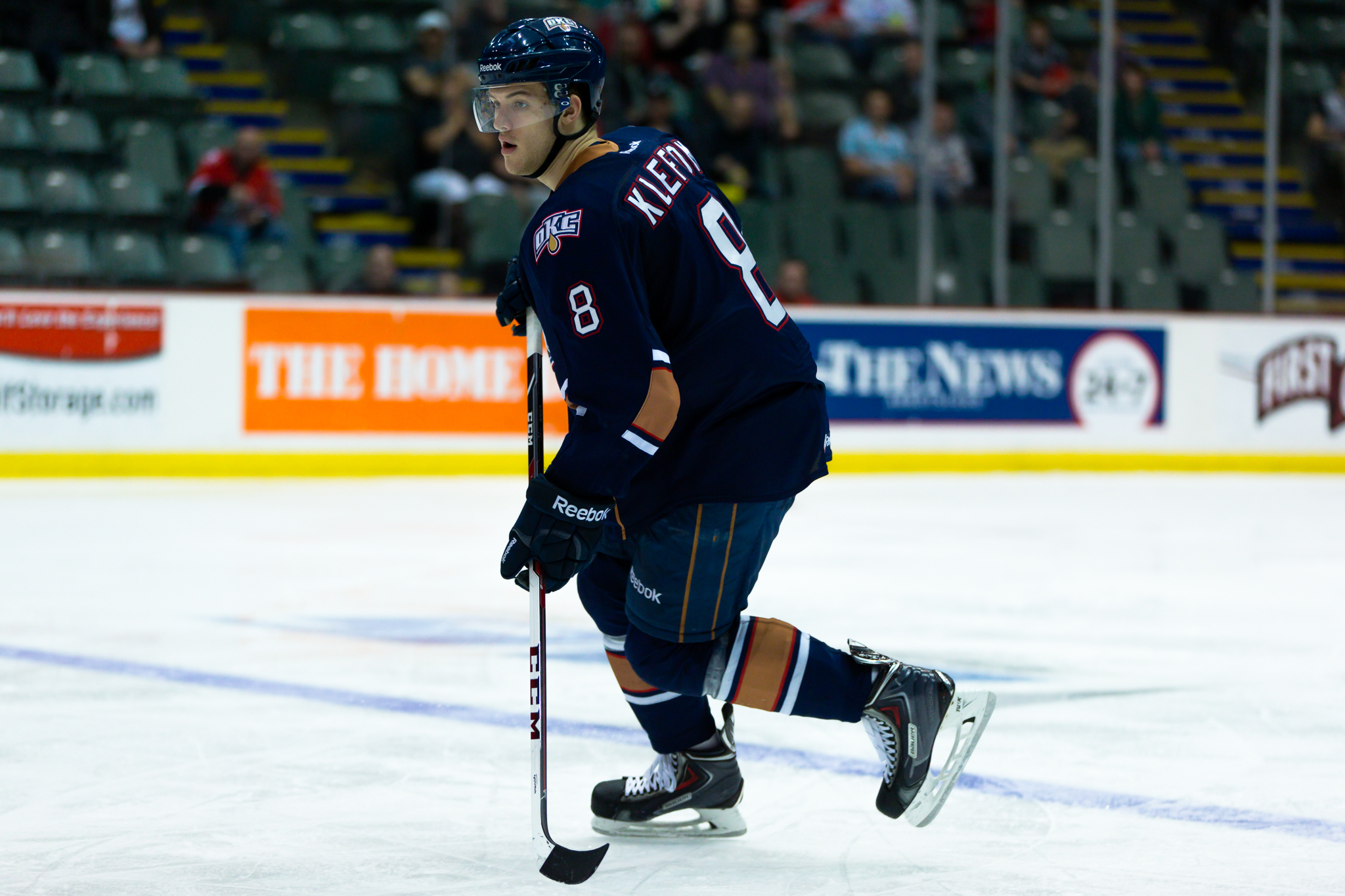
Klefbom with the Oklahoma City Barons in 2014.

After attending the Edmonton Oilers development camp, Klefbom began his first season in North America with their American Hockey League (AHL) affiliate, the Oklahoma City Barons. The assignment was to retain salary cap space and allow Klefbom to acclimate to the smaller ice. During his time with the Barons, Klefbom worked on improving his overall game including "winning the battles in the corners" and "staying strong in front of the net." Klefbom began the 2013–14 season by recording one assist through 12 games to earn his first NHL recall on 15 November 2013. He did not make his NHL debut during his recall and was reassigned to the AHL shortly thereafter. Upon returning to the AHL, Klefbom continued to work on his game and gathered two more assists before suffering an injury on 28 December. He missed numerous games to recover and rejoined the Barons lineup in mid-January. However, after returning to the lineup, Klefbom continued to grow confident in his game and earned greater responsibilities on the ice. When speaking of this development, Klefbom credited it to working with the Baron's assistant coach every day to improve his skills.

As a result of his improvements with the Barons, Klefbom was recalled to the NHL level on 10 March 2014 on an emergency basis. The emergency designation was eventually dropped and Klefbom made his NHL debut the following day against the Minnesota Wild, where he recorded one assist in a 4–3 shootout win. A few games later, Klefbom tallied his first career NHL goal at 8:26 of the third period to lead the Oilers to a 4–3 overtime victory over the Anaheim Ducks. Klefbom finished the season skating in 17 NHL games and 48 AHL games.

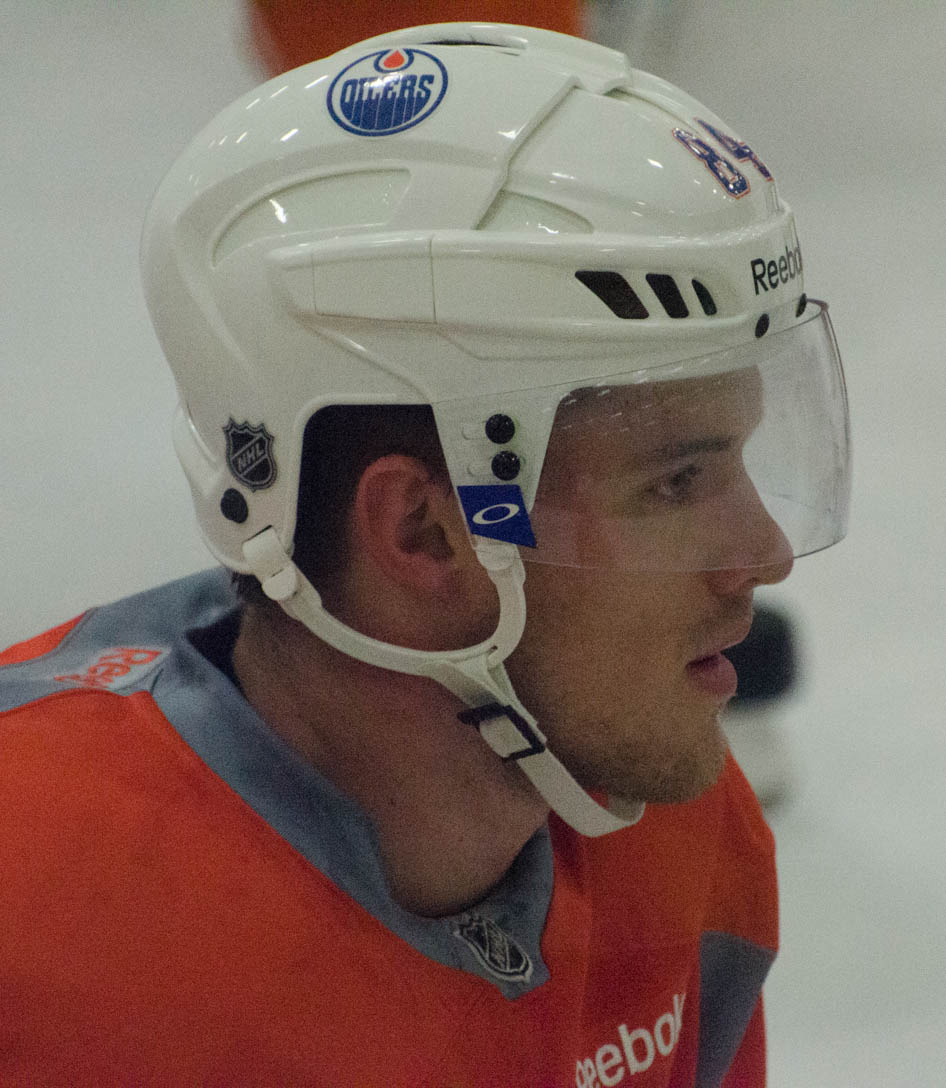
Klefbom during an Oilers practice in 2014.

Despite his play at the NHL level during the 2013–14 season, Klefbom was not guaranteed a spot in the Oiler's lineup for the 2014–15 season. He spent nine games with the Barons at the AHL level, recording eight points, before being recalled to the NHL for the remainder of the season. He quickly began to earn praise from the Oilers coaching staff and experienced an increased playing time. After missing a few games in December due to a foot injury, Klefbom was paired with Mark Fayne on the Oilers blueline. Upon returning from his injury, Klefbom kept on earning top minutes and often skated over 20 minutes per game. He was also often paired with Justin Schultz while playing a top-four role. When speaking about his improvements, coach Craig MacTavish stated: "[h]e just gives you 20 minutes of flawless hockey, and he’s had a great effect on Justin (Schultz)." Klefbom finished the season with two goals and 18 assists for 20 points through 60 games. He also ranked second among Oilers defencemen in points and time on ice while placing third among team defencemen in blocked shots. As such, Klefbom signed a seven-year, $29.2 million contract extension with the Oilers on 19 September 2015.

In the first year of his new contract, Klefbom played 30 games with the Oilers but injuries derailed most of his season causing him to sit 52 games on injured reserve. Klefbom began the 2015–16 season playing exhibition games with fellow Swede Adam Larsson on the Oilers’ top pairing. On 11 December, Klefbom broke a bone in his knuckle but was later diagnosed with an infection in his leg which kept him out of the lineup for over a month. While his finger healed, the coaching staff kept him out of the lineup through February in order to improve his skating, lung capacity, and energy levels. Klefbom originally intended to participate in for a few late regular-season Oilers’ games but his skin was too sensitive after two surgeries.

Following his injury-riddled season, Klefbom experienced a breakout 2016–17 campaign by tallying 12 goals and 26 assists through a career-high 82 games. He scored his first playoff goal 12 April 2017 vs the San Jose Sharks. His goal was the first Oilers playoff goal in 11 years.

Klefbom last played for the Oilers in August 2020. By then, a chronic shoulder injury left Klefbom unable to continue playing. In 2024 after several surgeries, he announced his retirement at age 31.

== Career statistics ==
=== Regular season and playoffs ===
			Regular season					Playoffs
Season	Team	League	GP	G	A	Pts	PIM	GP	G	A	Pts	PIM
2008–09	Färjestad BK	J18	6	1	1	2	2	—	—	—	—	—
2008–09	Färjestad BK	J18 Allsv	9	1	1	2	2	4	0	1	1	2
2009–10	Färjestad BK	J18	19	6	10	16	27	—	—	—	—	—
2009–10	Färjestad BK	J18 Allsv	12	4	8	12	10	6	0	0	0	0
2009–10	IFK Munkfors	SWE.3	3	0	1	1	0	—	—	—	—	—
2009–10	Skåre BK	SWE.3	2	0	0	0	2	—	—	—	—	—
2010–11	Färjestad BK	J18	3	1	2	3	0	—	—	—	—	—
2010–11	Färjestad BK	J18 Allsv	5	2	1	3	2	—	—	—	—	—
2010–11	Färjestad BK	SEL	23	1	1	2	2	—	—	—	—	—
2010–11	Skåre BK	SWE.3	12	0	1	1	0	—	—	—	—	—
2011–12	Färjestad BK	J20	15	1	3	4	0	—	—	—	—	—
2011–12	Färjestad BK	SEL	33	2	0	2	4	11	0	1	1	2
2012–13	Färjestad BK	SEL	11	0	3	3	2	—	—	—	—	—
2013–14	Oklahoma City Barons	AHL	48	1	9	10	10	2	0	1	1	4
2013–14	Edmonton Oilers	NHL	17	1	2	3	0	—	—	—	—	—
2014–15	Oklahoma City Barons	AHL	9	1	7	8	4	—	—	—	—	—
2014–15	Edmonton Oilers	NHL	60	2	18	20	4	—	—	—	—	—
2015–16	Edmonton Oilers	NHL	30	4	8	12	6	—	—	—	—	—
2016–17	Edmonton Oilers	NHL	82	12	26	38	6	12	2	3	5	0
2017–18	Edmonton Oilers	NHL	66	5	16	21	18	—	—	—	—	—
2018–19	Edmonton Oilers	NHL	61	5	23	28	16	—	—	—	—	—
2019–20	Edmonton Oilers	NHL	62	5	29	34	24	4	0	2	2	0
SEL totals			67	3	4	7	8	11	0	1	1	2
NHL totals			378	34	122	156	74	16	2	5	7	0

=== International ===
Medal record

Representing Sweden

Men's ice hockey

World Junior Championships
Gold medal – first place	2012 Sweden	

Year	Team	Event	Result	GP	G	A	Pts	PIM
2010	Sweden	U17	3rd place, bronze medalist(s)	6	1	3	4	2
2011	Sweden	U18	2nd place, silver medalist(s)	6	1	3	4	4
2012	Sweden	WJC	1st place, gold medalist(s)	6	1	1	2	2
2015	Sweden	WC	5th	8	1	3	4	4
Junior totals				18	3	7	10	8
Senior totals				8	1	3	4	4

== Awards and honours ==
Award	Year
WJC First Team All-Star	2012

Awards and achievements
Preceded by Ryan Nugent-Hopkins	Edmonton Oilers first-round draft pick 2011	Succeeded by Nail Yakupov
