= Bryan Helmer =

Canadian ice hockey player (born 1972)

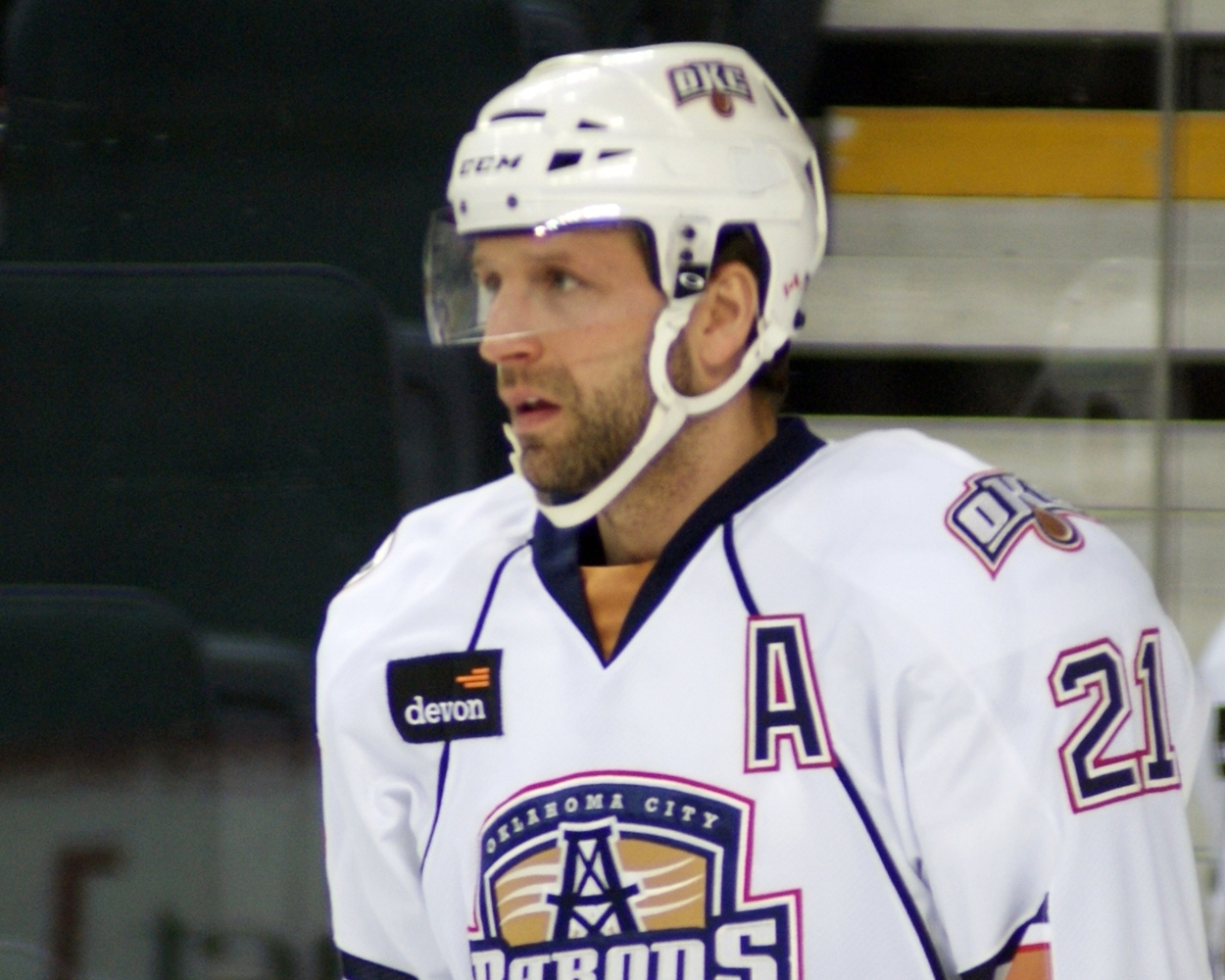
- Helmer in 2011
- Born: July 15, 1972 (age 54) Sault Ste. Marie, Ontario, Canada
- Height: 6 ft 1 in (185 cm)
- Weight: 208 lb (94 kg; 14 st 12 lb)
- Position: Defence
- Shot: Right
- Played for: Phoenix Coyotes; St. Louis Blues; Vancouver Canucks; Washington Capitals
- NHL draft: Undrafted
- Playing career: 1993–2013

Bryan Berry Helmer (born July 15, 1972) is a Canadian former professional ice hockey player. He is currently the VP of hockey operations with the Hershey Bears of the American Hockey League (AHL). He previously served as an assistant coach with the Bears and the Peterborough Petes of the Ontario Hockey League (OHL). A veteran of over 1,000 AHL and IHL games, Helmer previously served as captain for the Bears and played in the National Hockey League (NHL) with the Phoenix Coyotes, St. Louis Blues, Vancouver Canucks and the Washington Capitals.

== Early life ==
Helmer was born on July 15, 1972, in Sault Ste. Marie, Ontario, Canada to Bryan and Jo Ann Helmer.

== Playing career ==
Helmer went undrafted but was signed as a free agent by the New Jersey Devils in 1994. He never played a game with the Devils, instead playing with their minor league affiliate Albany River Rats for 5 years. His most successful season with the River Rats was during the 1997–98 season when he scored 63 points in 80 games along with 101 PIM and an appearance in the AHL All-Star Game.

Following the 1997–98 season Helmer signed with the Phoenix Coyotes. He made his NHL debut with the Coyotes, appearing in 11 games. He was then released and later claimed on waivers by the St. Louis Blues. He appeared in another 29 games with the Blues, notching four assists. The 1999–2000 season saw Helmer play the majority of the year with the Worcester IceCats while also appearing in 15 games with the St. Louis Blues. On February 12, 2000, Helmer scored his first career NHL goal against Guy Hebert and the Mighty Ducks of Anaheim in a 6-3 Blues victory

After the 1999–00 season, Helmer signed with the Vancouver Canucks. He spent the next three years bouncing between the Canucks and the minors. The 2001–02 season saw Helmer achieve NHL career highs with ten points and 53 PIM. In addition, Helmer played six games in the playoffs that year, the only time he played in the Stanley Cup Playoffs.

On July 25, 2003, Helmer was traded by the Canucks back to the Phoenix Coyotes for Martin Grenier. He missed the majority of the 2003–04 season due to a shoulder injury but managed to appear in 17 games with the Coyotes. Prior to the 2008–09 season, this had been the last time Helmer played in the NHL. He signed with the Detroit Red Wings in 2004 but played two years in the AHL with the Grand Rapids Griffins. He was re-signed by the Coyotes in 2006 and had been playing with the San Antonio Rampage.

Helmer signed with the Hershey Bears on July 24, 2008, and served as captain of the team. On November 28, 2008, the Washington Capitals signed and recalled Helmer from Hershey due to several key injuries among the Capitals' defensemen. Helmer led the Bears to Calder Cups in 2009 and 2010.

While with the Oklahoma City Barons, Helmer became the AHL all-time leading scorer among defencemen in 2011, passing John Slaney. Helmer has 564 points in 1116 AHL games.

After captaining the Barons in his second season with the club, Helmer was left unsigned through the beginning of the 2012–13 season, due to the NHL lockout. After an agreement was reached, Helmer was signed by the Springfield Falcons on January 9, 2013.

=== Retirement and legacy ===
Helmer officially announced his retirement from professional hockey on July 22, 2013, and became an assistant coach with the Peterborough Petes. In 2014, the Wellington Dukes retired Helmer's jersey number, making him the first player in franchise history to have his jersey number honoured by the team. In 2017, Helmer was inducted into the Prince Edward County Sports Hall of Fame and AHL Hall of Fame.

== Post-playing career ==
Helmer served as assistant coach for the Hershey Bears during the 2015–2016 season and was promoted to VP of hockey operations in July 2016. While serving in this role, the Bears claimed their 12th and 13th Calder Cup titles in 2023 and 2024. Helmer became the first executive in AHL history to win back-to-back James C. Hendy Memorial Awards.

== Personal life ==
Helmer and his wife Pam have two children together. Through his marriage to Pam, Helmer is the brother-in-law of former professional defenseman Matt Carkner.

== Career statistics ==
=== Regular season and playoffs ===
			Regular season					Playoffs
Season	Team	League	GP	G	A	Pts	PIM	GP	G	A	Pts	PIM
1989–90	Wellington Dukes	OJHL	51	6	22	28	204	—	—	—	—	—
1989–90	Belleville Bulls	OHL	6	0	1	1	0	—	—	—	—	—
1990–91	Wellington Dukes	OJHL	50	11	14	25	109	—	—	—	—	—
1991–92	Wellington Dukes	OJHL	45	19	32	51	66	—	—	—	—	—
1992–93	Wellington Dukes	OJHL	57	25	62	87	62	—	—	—	—	—
1993–94	Albany River Rats	AHL	65	4	19	23	79	5	0	0	0	9
1994–95	Albany River Rats	AHL	77	7	36	43	101	7	1	0	1	0
1995–96	Albany River Rats	AHL	80	14	30	44	107	4	2	0	2	6
1996–97	Albany River Rats	AHL	77	12	27	39	113	16	1	7	8	10
1997–98	Albany River Rats	AHL	80	14	49	63	101	13	4	9	13	18
1998–99	Las Vegas Thunder	IHL	8	1	3	4	28	—	—	—	—	—
1998–99	Phoenix Coyotes	NHL	11	0	0	0	23	—	—	—	—	—
1998–99	St. Louis Blues	NHL	29	0	4	4	19	—	—	—	—	—
1998–99	Worcester IceCats	AHL	16	7	8	15	18	4	0	0	0	12
1999–00	Worcester IceCats	AHL	54	10	25	35	124	9	1	4	5	10
1999–00	St. Louis Blues	NHL	15	1	1	2	10	—	—	—	—	—
2000–01	Kansas City Blades	IHL	42	4	15	19	76	—	—	—	—	—
2000–01	Vancouver Canucks	NHL	20	2	4	6	18	—	—	—	—	—
2001–02	Manitoba Moose	AHL	34	6	18	24	69	—	—	—	—	—
2001–02	Vancouver Canucks	NHL	40	5	5	10	53	6	0	0	0	0
2002–03	Manitoba Moose	AHL	60	7	24	31	82	14	0	4	4	20
2002–03	Vancouver Canucks	NHL	2	0	0	0	0	—	—	—	—	—
2003–04	Springfield Falcons	AHL	9	1	6	7	6	—	—	—	—	—
2003–04	Phoenix Coyotes	NHL	17	0	1	1	10	—	—	—	—	—
2004–05	Grand Rapids Griffins	AHL	80	7	18	25	64	—	—	—	—	—
2005–06	Grand Rapids Griffins	AHL	80	12	44	56	138	16	1	8	9	24
2006–07	San Antonio Rampage	AHL	70	6	23	29	81	—	—	—	—	—
2007–08	San Antonio Rampage	AHL	66	5	15	20	53	7	0	0	0	6
2008–09	Hershey Bears	AHL	62	2	25	27	59	22	3	5	8	24
2008–09	Washington Capitals	NHL	12	0	3	3	2	—	—	—	—	—
2009–10	Hershey Bears	AHL	71	6	26	32	95	21	0	5	5	33
2010–11	Oklahoma City Barons	AHL	42	6	19	25	25	6	1	1	2	8
2011–12	Oklahoma City Barons	AHL	69	3	21	24	45	14	0	3	3	6
2012–13	Springfield Falcons	AHL	24	0	2	2	19	1	0	0	0	0
AHL totals			1116	129	435	564	1379	159	14	46	60	186
NHL totals			146	8	18	26	135	6	0	0	0	0

== Awards ==
- 1997–98: AHL First All-Star Team
- 2005–06: AHL Second All-Star Team
- 2017 AHL Hall of Fame inductee
