= Derek Nesbitt =

Canadian ice hockey player and coach

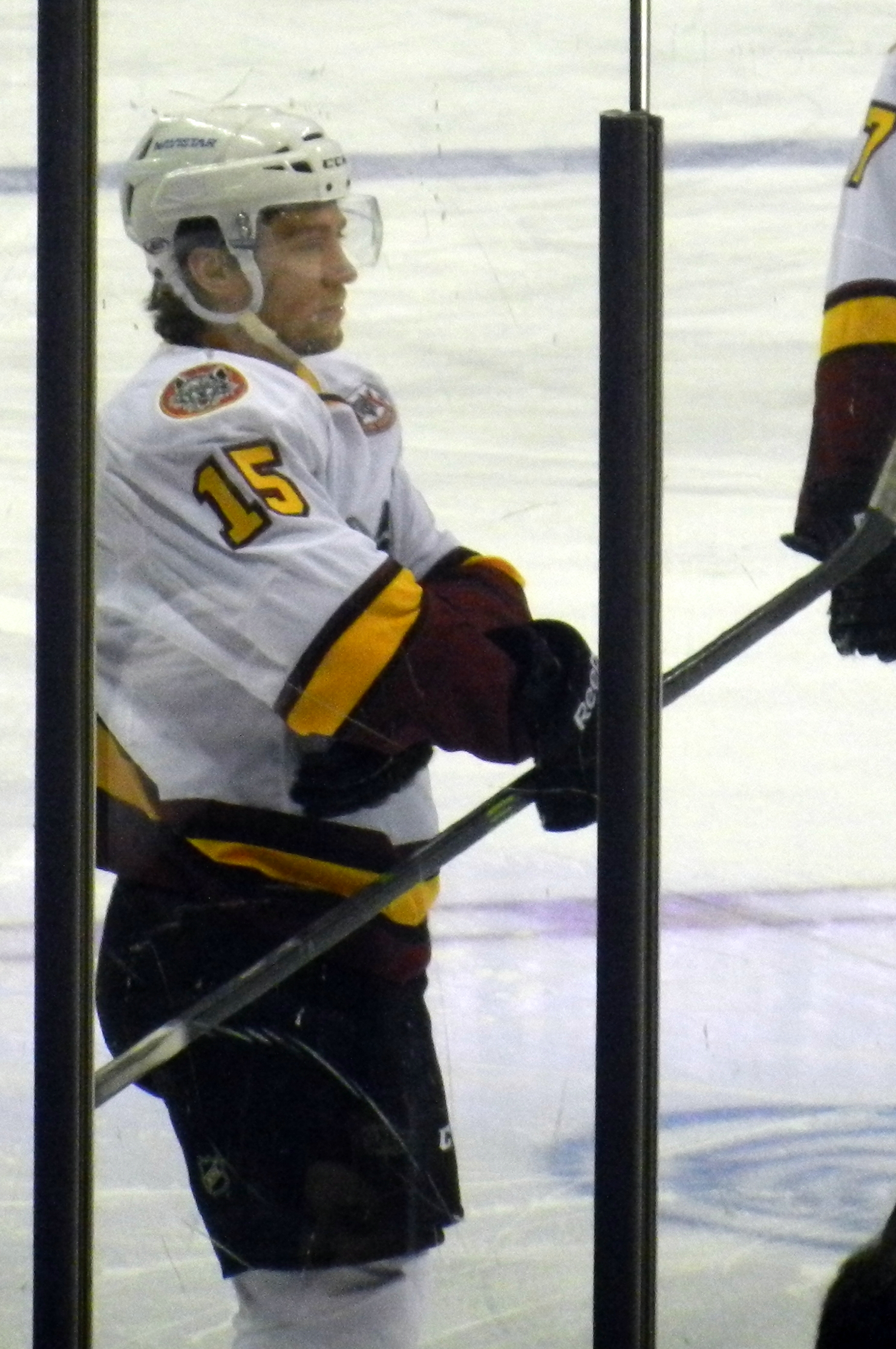
- Born: April 16, 1982 (age 44) Egmondville, Ontario, Canada
- Height: 6 ft 0 in (183 cm)
- Weight: 185 lb (84 kg; 13 st 3 lb)
- Position: Left wing
- Shot: Right
- Played for: Rockford IceHogs; San Antonio Rampage; Manitoba Moose; Peoria Rivermen; WBS Penguins; Oklahoma City Barons; Chicago Wolves; HC Bolzano
- NHL draft: Undrafted
- Playing career: 2005–2022

Derek Nesbitt (born April 16, 1982) is a Canadian former professional ice hockey player and a former head coach of the Atlanta Gladiators of the ECHL.

== Playing career ==
Nesbitt, who was not selected in the NHL Draft, played for the Wilkes-Barre/Scranton Penguins during the 2012-13 season after being acquired from the Peoria Rivermen in a trade on April 10, 2013.

On July 12, 2013, Nesbitt agreed to a one-year AHL contract with the Oklahoma City Barons as a free agent. Nesbitt started the 2013-14 season with the Barons, scoring 10 goals and 19 points in 38 games before he was traded to the San Antonio Rampage on January 17, 2014. His second stint with the Rampage lasted just 5 games before he was again traded for future considerations to the Chicago Wolves on February 8, 2014.

As a free agent, Nesbitt chose to continue his career in Europe by signing a one-year deal with HC Bolzano, the reigning champions of the EBEL, on August 20, 2014. After spending a season in Austria, he came back to North America, rejoining the Gwinnett Gladiators, who would later be renamed the Atlanta Gladiators, for a fourth stint on a one-year contract signed August 1, 2015.

After six seasons as a key player and team captain with the Atlanta Gladiators, Nesbitt announced his retirement from professional hockey on 2022-07-11, concluding a 16-year playing career.

On November 8, 2022, Nesbitt was appointed as the Assistant Coach of the Gladiators.

On June 6, 2023, the Atlanta Gladiators named Nesbitt as the sixth head coach in the franchise's history.

== Career statistics ==
| | | | Regular season | | | | | Playoffs |
| Season | Team | League | GP | G | A | Pts | PIM | GP | G | A | Pts | PIM |
|---|---|---|---|---|---|---|---|---|---|---|---|---|
| 2001–02 | Ferris State University | CCHA | 36 | 9 | 11 | 20 | 16 | — | — | — | — | — |
| 2002–03 | Ferris State University | CCHA | 42 | 20 | 33 | 53 | 26 | — | — | — | — | — |
| 2003–04 | Ferris State University | CCHA | 38 | 11 | 17 | 28 | 36 | — | — | — | — | — |
| 2004–05 | Ferris State University | CCHA | 38 | 19 | 21 | 40 | 44 | — | — | — | — | — |
| 2004–05 | Bossier-Shreveport Mudbugs | CHL | — | — | — | — | — | 7 | 0 | 5 | 5 | 0 |
| 2005–06 | Gwinnett Gladiators | ECHL | 71 | 26 | 43 | 69 | 6 | 17 | 6 | 7 | 13 | 8 |
| 2006–07 | Idaho Steelheads | ECHL | 66 | 30 | 51 | 81 | 32 | 22 | 6 | 12 | 18 | 8 |
| 2007–08 | Gwinnett Gladiators | ECHL | 26 | 11 | 28 | 39 | 4 | — | — | — | — | — |
| 2007–08 | Rockford IceHogs | AHL | 46 | 17 | 18 | 35 | 6 | 12 | 3 | 3 | 6 | 12 |
| 2008–09 | San Antonio Rampage | AHL | 49 | 6 | 9 | 15 | 6 | — | — | — | — | — |
| 2008–09 | Manitoba Moose | AHL | 5 | 0 | 4 | 4 | 0 | 1 | 0 | 0 | 0 | 0 |
| 2009–10 | Rockford IceHogs | AHL | 23 | 4 | 1 | 5 | 6 | — | — | — | — | — |
| 2009–10 | Toledo Walleye | ECHL | 37 | 11 | 22 | 33 | 15 | 4 | 3 | 1 | 4 | 0 |
| 2010–11 | Gwinnett Gladiators | ECHL | 11 | 8 | 10 | 18 | 6 | — | — | — | — | — |
| 2010–11 | Peoria Rivermen | AHL | 55 | 17 | 25 | 42 | 12 | 4 | 0 | 2 | 2 | 0 |
| 2011–12 | Peoria Rivermen | AHL | 75 | 22 | 33 | 55 | 14 | — | — | — | — | — |
| 2012–13 | Peoria Rivermen | AHL | 66 | 26 | 21 | 47 | 18 | — | — | — | — | — |
| 2012–13 | Wilkes-Barre/Scranton Penguins | AHL | 1 | 0 | 0 | 0 | 0 | 14 | 0 | 6 | 6 | 4 |
| 2013–14 | Oklahoma City Barons | AHL | 38 | 10 | 9 | 19 | 16 | — | — | — | — | — |
| 2013–14 | San Antonio Rampage | AHL | 5 | 1 | 0 | 1 | 0 | — | — | — | — | — |
| 2013–14 | Chicago Wolves | AHL | 9 | 1 | 1 | 2 | 0 | — | — | — | — | — |
| 2014–15 | HC Bolzano | EBEL | 53 | 14 | 28 | 42 | 14 | 7 | 3 | 4 | 7 | 0 |
| 2015–16 | Atlanta Gladiators | ECHL | 72 | 28 | 34 | 62 | 20 | — | — | — | — | — |
| 2016–17 | Atlanta Gladiators | ECHL | 72 | 27 | 25 | 52 | 20 | — | — | — | — | — |
| 2017–18 | Atlanta Gladiators | ECHL | 71 | 15 | 22 | 37 | 18 | 4 | 2 | 0 | 2 | 0 |
| 2018–19 | Atlanta Gladiators | ECHL | 64 | 18 | 32 | 50 | 12 | — | — | — | — | — |
| 2019–20 | Atlanta Gladiators | ECHL | 60 | 15 | 31 | 46 | 10 | — | — | — | — | — |
| 2021–22 | Atlanta Gladiators | ECHL | 65 | 18 | 33 | 51 | 12 | 4 | 1 | 1 | 2 | 0 |
| AHL totals | | | 372 | 104 | 121 | 225 | 78 | 31 | 3 | 11 | 14 | 16 |
