= Mario Lamoureux =

American ice hockey player (born 1988)

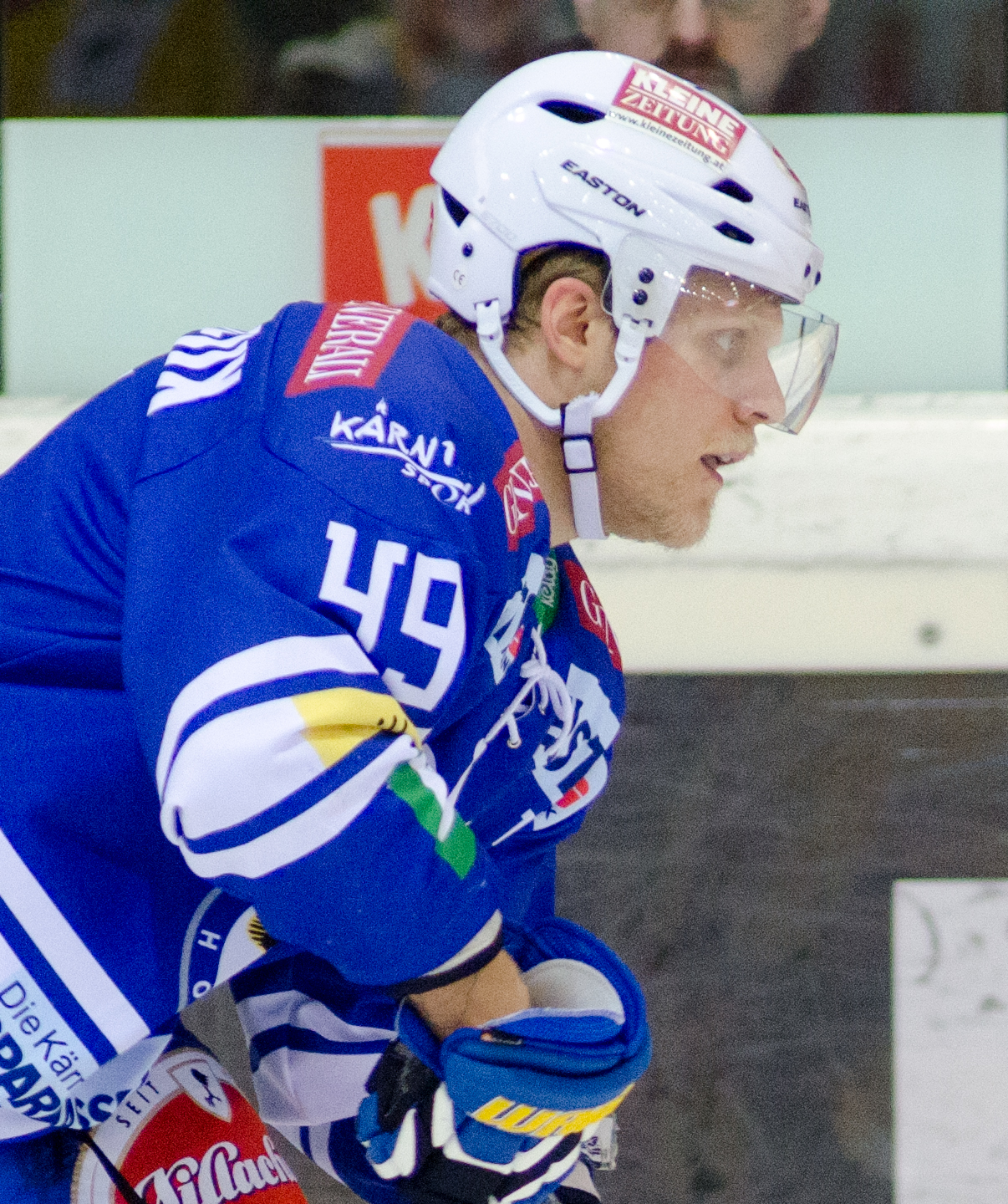
- Born: June 18, 1988 (age 38) Grand Forks, North Dakota, U.S.
- Height: 5 ft 9 in (175 cm)
- Weight: 185 lb (84 kg; 13 st 3 lb)
- Position: Centre
- Shoots: Left
- DEL2 team Former teams: Dresdner Eislöwen; Oklahoma City Barons; EC VSV; Bridgeport Sound Tigers; Charlotte Checkers; Esbjerg Energy; HC TWK Innsbruck; Frisk Asker; EHC Winterthur; Graz 99ers
- NHL draft: Undrafted
- Playing career: 2012–present

Mario Lamoureux (born June 18, 1988) is an American hockey coach and former professional ice hockey forward. He last played with Dresdner Eislöwen of the DEL2.

== Playing career ==
He spent four years with the Tri-City Storm of the USHL until 2008 and left as their all-time leading scorer (129 points in 236 games). Lamoureux enrolled at the University of North Dakota in 2008. In his four-year college career, he helped UND win three WCHA Championships and served as team captain in his senior year. Along with his teammate Evan Trupp, he received the Cliff "Fido" Purpur Award for "hard work, determination and being a creator of excitement on the ice" in his sophomore year. He was named Team Captain in his senior year during the 2011–2012 season.

Upon graduation in 2012, he logged his first minutes as a professional player in the East Coast Hockey League (ECHL), playing for the Gwinnett Gladiators. In his first full ECHL season (2012–13) with the Ontario Reign, Lamoureux was named to the All-Rookie team, after tallying 25 goals and 40 assists in 71 appearances. He re-signed with the Reign for the 2013-14 ECHL season and also spent time with the Oklahoma City Barons of the American Hockey League (AHL) that year. In February 2014, he embarked on a short stint with EC VSV of the Austrian top-flight EBEL who signed Lamoureux shortly before the start of the EBEL playoffs.

He was traded from the Reign to the Quad City Mallards in October 2014 and made 68 ECHL appearances for the team, scoring 20 goals and assisting on 51 others. Lamoureux signed a professional tryout agreement (PTO) with the Bridgeport Sound Tigers of the AHL in January 2015 and played two games for them. In April 2015, he was given a PTO by another AHL side, the Charlotte Checkers, while keeping his eligibility to play for the Mallards in the ECHL playoffs.

Lamoureux signed with Esbjerg Energy of the Danish Metal Ligaen for the 2015–16 season. He was a key member of Esbjerg's championship-winning campaign, recording 26 goals and 35 assists in 45 games of the regular season as well as two goals and eleven assists in 18 post-season contests. After his year in Denmark, Lamoureux took up an offer from Austria, penning a deal with EBEL outfit HC Innsbruck in May 2016. He was last under contract with Bad Toelz EC of the DEL2.

== Coaching career ==
After moving back to the United States, Lamoureux became the inaugural head coach of Legacy High School in 2021. After two successful seasons leading the Sabers to the state tournament, he resigned his position to head Bismarck's youth hockey program.

== Personal ==
Lamoureux comes from a hockey family: His father Pierre, a native of Fort Saskatchewan, Alberta, was a goaltender at the University of North Dakota in the late 1970s and early 1980s. Mario's sisters Monique and Jocelyne were members of the silver-winning US women's ice hockey team at the 2010 Olympic Games, the 2014 Olympic games and won Gold at the 2018 Olympic games. His brothers Jacques and Jean-Philippe are playing professionally, his brother Pierre-Paul was an assistant coach at UND and a scout for the Calgary Flames.

== Career statistics ==
| | | | Regular season | | | | | Playoffs |
| Season | Team | League | GP | G | A | Pts | PIM | GP | G | A | Pts | PIM |
|---|---|---|---|---|---|---|---|---|---|---|---|---|
| 2004–05 | Tri-City Storm | USHL | 59 | 7 | 15 | 22 | 71 | 9 | 0 | 2 | 2 | 25 |
| 2005–06 | Tri-City Storm | USHL | 57 | 13 | 19 | 32 | 131 | 5 | 0 | 0 | 0 | 8 |
| 2006–07 | Tri-City Storm | USHL | 60 | 15 | 19 | 34 | 100 | 9 | 2 | 2 | 4 | 20 |
| 2007–08 | Tri-City Storm | USHL | 60 | 9 | 32 | 41 | 152 | — | — | — | — | — |
| 2008–09 | U. of North Dakota | WCHA | 24 | 3 | 3 | 6 | 18 | — | — | — | — | — |
| 2009–10 | U. of North Dakota | WCHA | 42 | 7 | 5 | 12 | 85 | — | — | — | — | — |
| 2010–11 | U. of North Dakota | WCHA | 43 | 3 | 14 | 17 | 65 | — | — | — | — | — |
| 2011–12 | U. of North Dakota | WCHA | 39 | 4 | 7 | 11 | 60 | — | — | — | — | — |
| 2011–12 | Gwinnett Gladiators | ECHL | 2 | 0 | 0 | 0 | 0 | 4 | 0 | 0 | 0 | 2 |
| 2012–13 | Ontario Reign | ECHL | 71 | 25 | 40 | 65 | 69 | 10 | 3 | 2 | 5 | 14 |
| 2013–14 | Ontario Reign | ECHL | 46 | 20 | 20 | 40 | 36 | — | — | — | — | — |
| 2013–14 | Oklahoma City Barons | AHL | 3 | 0 | 1 | 1 | 4 | — | — | — | — | — |
| 2013–14 | EC VSV | EBEL | 4 | 1 | 1 | 2 | 6 | 9 | 1 | 5 | 6 | 10 |
| 2014–15 | Quad City Mallards | ECHL | 68 | 20 | 51 | 71 | 77 | 3 | 1 | 0 | 1 | 4 |
| 2014–15 | Bridgeport Sound Tigers | AHL | 2 | 1 | 0 | 1 | 0 | — | — | — | — | — |
| 2014–15 | Charlotte Checkers | AHL | 3 | 2 | 0 | 2 | 2 | — | — | — | — | — |
| 2015–16 | Esbjerg Energy | DEN | 45 | 26 | 35 | 61 | 81 | 18 | 2 | 11 | 13 | 26 |
| 2016–17 | HC TWK Innsbruck | EBEL | 54 | 20 | 27 | 47 | 70 | 2 | 2 | 0 | 2 | 6 |
| 2017–18 | Frisk Asker | GET | 20 | 10 | 9 | 19 | 18 | — | — | — | — | — |
| 2017–18 | EHC Winterthur | SL | 24 | 4 | 13 | 17 | 57 | — | — | — | — | — |
| 2017–18 | Graz 99ers | EBEL | 6 | 7 | 3 | 10 | 4 | — | — | — | — | — |
| 2018–19 | HC TWK Innsbruck | EBEL | 52 | 18 | 19 | 37 | 43 | — | — | — | — | — |
| 2019-20 | Dresden Ice Lions | DEL-2 | 52 | 23 | 44 | 67 | 64 | — | — | — | — | — |
| 2020-21 | Bad Toelz EC | DEL-2 | 18 | 8 | 12 | 20 | 14 | — | — | — | — | — |
| AHL totals | | | 8 | 3 | 1 | 4 | 6 | — | — | — | — | — |

== Awards and honors ==
| Award | Year |
|---|---|
College
| WCHA All-Academic Team | 2010, 2011, 2012 |
| WCHA All-Tournament Team | 2012 |
ECHL
| All-Rookie Team | 2013 |
