= Brandon Davidson =

Canadian ice hockey player (born 1991)

- Davidson with the Eisbären Berlin in 2026
- Born: August 21, 1991 (age 35) Taber, Alberta, Canada
- Height: 6 ft 2 in (188 cm)
- Weight: 208 lb (94 kg; 14 st 12 lb)
- Position: Defence
- Shoots: Left
- ELH team Former teams: HC Kometa Brno; Färjestad BK; Edmonton Oilers; Montreal Canadiens; New York Islanders; Chicago Blackhawks; Calgary Flames; San Jose Sharks; Buffalo Sabres
- NHL draft: 162nd overall, 2010; Edmonton Oilers
- Playing career: 2011–present

Brandon Davidson (born August 21, 1991) is a Canadian professional ice hockey defenceman who is currently playing with HC Kometa Brno of the Czech Extraliga (ELH). He has previously played in the National Hockey League (NHL) for the Buffalo Sabres, San Jose Sharks, Calgary Flames, Chicago Blackhawks, New York Islanders, Montreal Canadiens and Edmonton Oilers, who selected him in the sixth-round, 162nd overall, in the 2010 NHL entry draft and Färjestad BK (SHL).

== Playing career ==
=== Junior ===
Prior to playing professional hockey, Davidson played junior with the Regina Pats of the Western Hockey League. Davidson was named the Pats Rookie of the Year after the 2009–10 season. Davidson was selected in the sixth round, 162nd overall, by the Edmonton Oilers during the 2010 NHL entry draft. In his final season of junior hockey, Davidson served as the Pats captain.

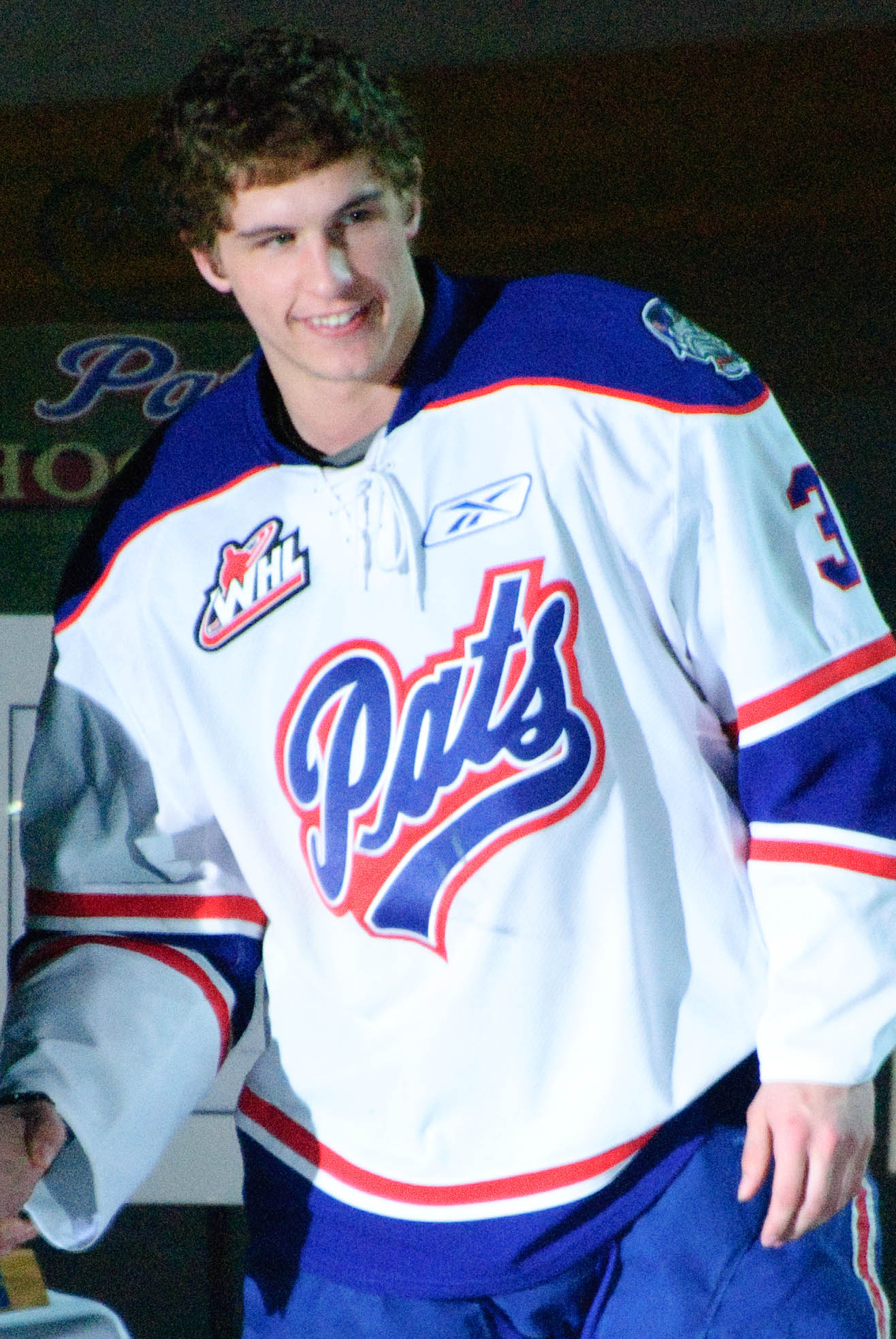
Davidson with the Regina Pats

=== Professional ===
Davidson signed his first professional contract with the Oilers on May 31, 2012. During his first full professional season with the Oklahoma City Barons of the American Hockey League (AHL), Davidson was diagnosed with testicular cancer after a routine medical exam. He underwent surgery and chemotherapy before being cleared to return to playing hockey. Davidson started his return to hockey with the Stockton Thunder of the ECHL. He was named the winner of the Fred T. Hunt Memorial Award in 2013, as the AHL player who best exemplifies the qualities of sportsmanship, determination and dedication to hockey.

On February 28, 2017, Davidson was traded by the Oilers to the Montreal Canadiens in exchange for David Desharnais. During the 2017–18 season, Davidson was waived by the Canadiens on December 2, 2017, and was reclaimed by the Oilers on December 3. Davidson recorded his first multi-goal game on January 25, 2018 with two goals against the Calgary Flames, and was also the first time he earned a first star in a game.

On February 24, 2018, Davidson was traded by the Oilers to the New York Islanders in exchange for a 2019 third-round pick. Davidson joined the Islanders for the final stretch of the season, appearing in 15 games and collecting a goal and assist as the club fell short of the post-season.

As an impending restricted free agent, Davidson was not tendered a qualifying offer by the Islanders resulting in his status as a free agent on June 25, 2018. On August 28, 2018, it was announced that Davidson would attend the Chicago Blackhawks' training camp on a professional tryout. On September 27, 2018, the Blackhawks signed Davidson to a one-year contract worth $650,000.

On July 1, 2019, Davidson signed a one-year, two-way contract with the Calgary Flames. He spent majority of the season with the Flames' American League affiliate, the Stockton Heat. Davidson also skated in seven games for the Flames. On February 24, 2020, he was traded to the San Jose Sharks in exchange for future considerations. Davidson made his Sharks debut on March 3 in a 5–2 win over the Toronto Maple Leafs. He appeared in only 5 games with the Sharks before the remainder of the regular season was cancelled due to the COVID-19 pandemic.

As a free agent from the Sharks, Davidson continued his journeyman career by agreeing to a one-year, two-way contract with his seventh NHL club, the Buffalo Sabres, on October 9, 2020. He appeared in just 6 games with the Sabres during the pandemic-delayed 2020–21 season, going scoreless.

As a free agent, Davidson opted to remain within the Sabres organization, agreeing to a one-year, two-way contract extension on July 28, 2021.

As a free agent from the Sabres, Davidson elected to continue his career overseas. On August 30, 2022, it was announced that Davidson had signed a two-year deal with Kunlun Red Star of the Kontinental Hockey League. Davidson never appeared with the Red Star, negating his deal and opting to remain in North America and continue his tenure with the Rochester Americans after signing a professional tryout on October 26, 2022, to begin the 2022–23 season. Davidson registered 1 assist through 9 games with the Amerks, before he was released from his PTO on November 28, 2022. On the following day, Davidson continued his tenure in the AHL by immediately signing contract for the remainder of the season with the Cleveland Monsters, the primary affiliate to the Columbus Blue Jackets.

Davidson made 27 regular-season appearances with the Monsters, registering 6 points, before he ended his contract in order to immediately join his first Swedish club, Färjestad BK of the SHL, on February 15, 2023.

== Career statistics ==
			Regular season					Playoffs
Season	Team	League	GP	G	A	Pts	PIM	GP	G	A	Pts	PIM
2007–08	Olds Grizzlys	AJHL	3	0	0	0	2	—	—	—	—	—
2008–09	Olds Grizzlys	AJHL	4	0	4	4	0	—	—	—	—	—
2009–10	Regina Pats	WHL	59	1	33	34	37	—	—	—	—	—
2010–11	Regina Pats	WHL	72	8	44	52	71	—	—	—	—	—
2010–11	Oklahoma City Barons	AHL	1	0	0	0	0	1	0	0	0	0
2011–12	Regina Pats	WHL	69	13	36	49	83	4	0	1	1	6
2012–13	Oklahoma City Barons	AHL	26	2	3	5	14	17	0	6	6	2
2012–13	Stockton Thunder	ECHL	11	7	5	12	4	—	—	—	—	—
2013–14	Oklahoma City Barons	AHL	68	5	8	13	58	3	0	1	1	0
2014–15	Oklahoma City Barons	AHL	55	4	6	10	43	10	1	1	2	12
2014–15	Edmonton Oilers	NHL	12	1	0	1	0	—	—	—	—	—
2015–16	Edmonton Oilers	NHL	51	4	7	11	20	—	—	—	—	—
2016–17	Edmonton Oilers	NHL	28	0	1	1	16	—	—	—	—	—
2016–17	Montreal Canadiens	NHL	10	0	2	2	4	3	0	0	0	0
2017–18	Montreal Canadiens	NHL	13	0	1	1	9	—	—	—	—	—
2017–18	Edmonton Oilers	NHL	23	3	1	4	10	—	—	—	—	—
2017–18	New York Islanders	NHL	15	1	1	2	4	—	—	—	—	—
2018–19	Chicago Blackhawks	NHL	10	0	1	1	15	—	—	—	—	—
2018–19	Rockford IceHogs	AHL	6	1	0	1	5	—	—	—	—	—
2019–20	Stockton Heat	AHL	34	3	17	20	19	—	—	—	—	—
2019–20	Calgary Flames	NHL	7	0	0	0	0	—	—	—	—	—
2019–20	San Jose Sharks	NHL	5	0	0	0	0	—	—	—	—	—
2020–21	Buffalo Sabres	NHL	6	0	0	0	4	—	—	—	—	—
2020–21	Rochester Americans	AHL	2	0	0	0	0	—	—	—	—	—
2021–22	Rochester Americans	AHL	23	1	5	6	38	6	0	0	0	10
2022–23	Rochester Americans	AHL	9	0	1	1	7	—	—	—	—	—
2022–23	Cleveland Monsters	AHL	27	3	3	6	14	—	—	—	—	—
NHL totals			180	9	14	23	82	3	0	0	0	0

== Awards and honours ==
Award	Year
WHL
East Second All-Star Team	2012
AHL
Fred T. Hunt Memorial Award	2013
