= Chris VandeVelde =

American ice hockey player (born 1987)

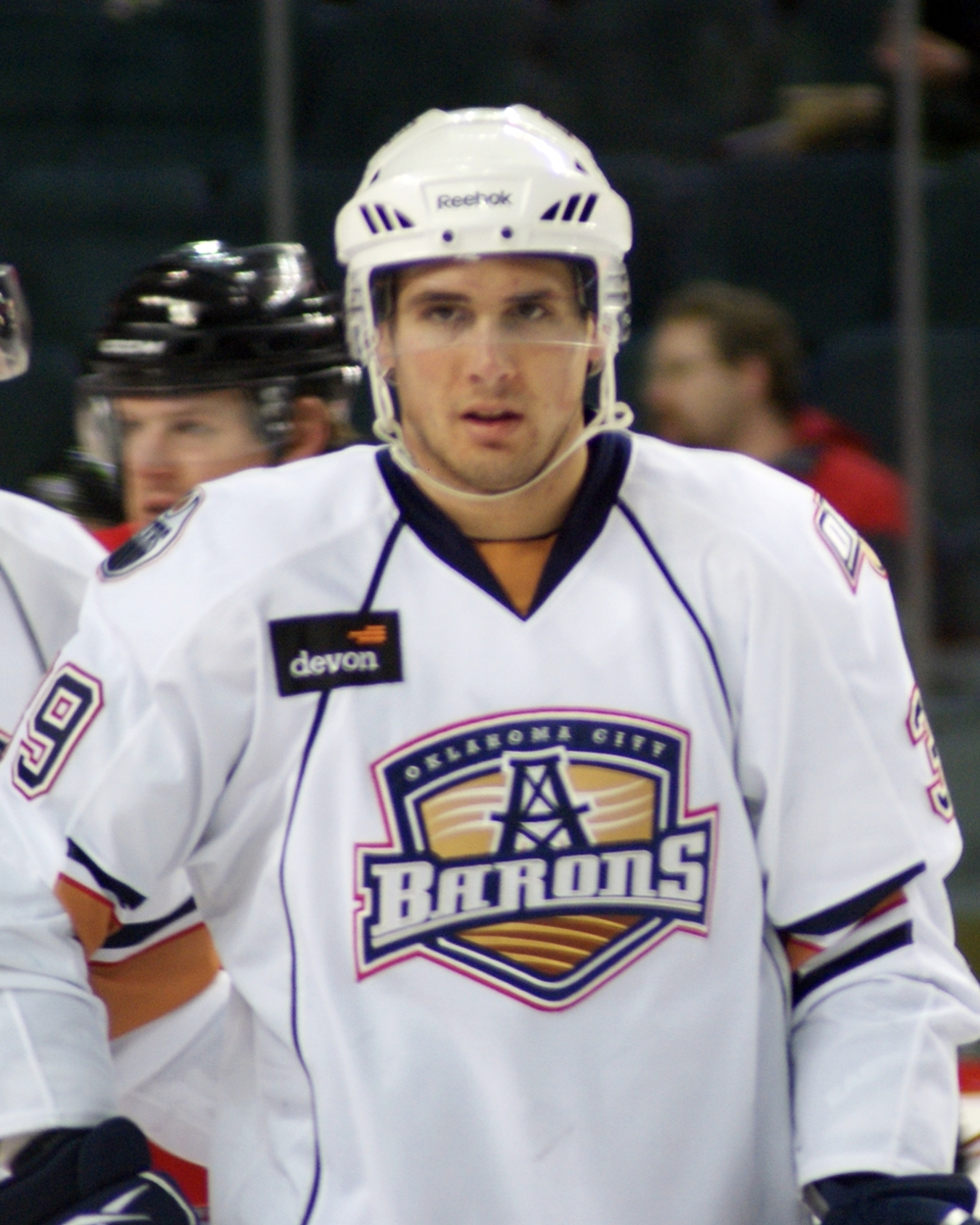
- VandeVelde with the Oklahoma City Barons in 2011
- Born: March 15, 1987 (age 39) Moorhead, Minnesota, U.S.
- Height: 6 ft 2 in (188 cm)
- Weight: 190 lb (86 kg; 13 st 8 lb)
- Position: Center
- Shot: Left
- Played for: Edmonton Oilers; Philadelphia Flyers; Lukko; EC Red Bull Salzburg
- NHL draft: 97th overall, 2005; Edmonton Oilers
- Playing career: 2010–2019

Chris VandeVelde (born March 15, 1987) is an American former professional ice hockey player. He last played for EC Red Bull Salzburg in the Austrian Hockey League (EBEL). VandeVelde was selected by the Edmonton Oilers in the 4th round (97th overall) of the 2005 NHL entry draft and played in the National Hockey League for the Oilers and the Philadelphia Flyers.

== Playing career ==
=== Amateur ===
VandeVelde played high school ice hockey for Moorhead High School (MHS) in Moorhead, Minnesota. He was a three-year letterman while helping MHS reach three consecutive state tournaments. In his senior season he recorded 77 points and was named the team's Most Valuable Player (MVP) and also earned all-state and all-tournament honors. In 2004, VandeVelde began playing for the Lincoln Stars of the United States Hockey League (USHL). He played two seasons in Lincoln playing in 63 games, registering 41 points. He was drafted in the fourth round, 97th overall, in the 2005 NHL entry draft by the Edmonton Oilers.

After playing for the Stars, VandeVelde began playing college hockey at the University of North Dakota (UND). He scored his first career collegiate goal during his freshman year in a 3–3 tie against St. Cloud State University on March 2, 2007. He struggled to score for most of the year, but in his final nine games he scored seven points helping him earn UND's Most Improved Player honors. In the WCHA Final Five semifinal game against St. Cloud State, VandeVelde registered a career high three point game, including his first career game-winning goal in a 6–2 win. During his sophomore season he led UND in shooting percentage while finishing third in team scoring. The following season, VandeVelde notched first collegiate hat trick in a 6–2 win over University of Alaska Anchorage. The hat trick helped him set a collegiate career high for goals with 18. For his senor season VandeVelde was named an alternate captain. During the season he recorded a career high 41 points to lead UND in scoring. In the 2010 WCHA Final Five tournament he scored two goals and added three assists in three games as UND won the championship earning the Broadmoor Trophy. VandeVelde was named to the All-Tournament Team, and at season's end he also named WCHA Scholar Athlete, an All-WCHA Academic Team selection, named to Inside College Hockey's All-America third team, and was named UND's Glenn "Red" Jarrett Male Athlete of the Year.

=== Professional ===
==== Edmonton Oilers ====
Following his four-year career at UND, VandeVelde signed a contract with the Oilers and began playing with their then American Hockey League (AHL) affiliate, the Springfield Falcons. He played in two games and registered his first professional assist. He began the 2010–11 season playing for the AHL's Oklahoma City Barons. After playing in 67 games and recording 12 goals and 16 points, he was called up to the Oilers. VandeVelde made his NHL debut on March 17, 2011, against the Phoenix Coyotes. On April 2, 2011, he registered his first NHL point, an assist, in a game against the Vancouver Canucks. He finished the year with two assists in twelve games at the NHL level. Following the completion of the Oilers season, VandeVelde was assigned back to Oklahoma City for the AHL playoffs. He played in six playoff games for the Barons, scoring one goal.

==== Philadelphia Flyers ====
VandeVelde attended the Philadelphia Flyers' training camp on a professional tryout agreement ahead of the 2013–14 season. VandeVelde did not earn a contract from the team, but rather signed with the team's AHL affiliate Adirondack Phantoms. On December 12, 2013, the Flyers signed VandeVelde to a one-year, two-way contract.

The Flyers re-signed VandeVelde to a one-year, two-way contract on July 4, 2014. VandeVelde spent majority of the 2014–15 season with the Flyers, playing in 72 games.

The following summer, the Flyers re-signed VandeVelde to a two-year, $1.425 million contract.

VandeVelde was summoned for a hearing with the NHL Department of Player Safety as a result of an elbow he delivered to the head of Chicago Blackhawks captain Jonathan Toews in a game on March 16, 2016. VandeVelde approached Toews with a lowered posture and back from a side angle, and attempted to deliver a legal shoulder check through the body. Prior to impact, Toews slowed his forward progress causing Vandevelde to miss time the hit. As a result, the main point of contact was between Vandeveldes elbow and Toews head. On March 18, 2016, the league announced that VandeVelde had been suspended for two games for the elbow, forfeiting $7,661 US in salary.

VandeVelde was not re-signed by the Flyers, making him an unrestricted free agent. On September 11, 2017, the Ottawa Senators signed VandeVelde to a professional tryout. He was released by the Senators on September 26, 2017.

== Personal life ==
VandeVelde married Olivia Wagner on June 25, 2011, in Cancun, Mexico.

== Career statistics ==
			Regular season					Playoffs
Season	Team	League	GP	G	A	Pts	PIM	GP	G	A	Pts	PIM
2003–04	Moorhead High	MNHS	29	20	27	47	10	—	—	—	—	—
2004–05	Moorhead High	MNHS	30	35	32	67	28	—	—	—	—	—
2004–05	Lincoln Stars	USHL	7	1	4	5	0	4	0	2	2	0
2005–06	Lincoln Stars	USHL	56	16	20	36	70	9	1	3	4	10
2006–07	University of North Dakota	WCHA	38	3	6	9	37	—	—	—	—	—
2007–08	University of North Dakota	WCHA	43	15	17	32	38	—	—	—	—	—
2008–09	University of North Dakota	WCHA	43	18	17	35	69	—	—	—	—	—
2009–10	University of North Dakota	WCHA	42	16	25	41	22	—	—	—	—	—
2009–10	Springfield Falcons	AHL	2	0	1	1	0	—	—	—	—	—
2010–11	Oklahoma City Barons	AHL	67	12	4	16	45	6	1	0	1	6
2010–11	Edmonton Oilers	NHL	12	0	2	2	12	—	—	—	—	—
2011–12	Oklahoma City Barons	AHL	68	7	16	23	33	14	6	0	6	10
2011–12	Edmonton Oilers	NHL	5	1	0	1	2	—	—	—	—	—
2012–13	Oklahoma City Barons	AHL	57	7	13	20	27	17	2	2	4	10
2012–13	Edmonton Oilers	NHL	11	0	0	0	4	—	—	—	—	—
2013–14	Adirondack Phantoms	AHL	41	10	14	24	27	—	—	—	—	—
2013–14	Philadelphia Flyers	NHL	18	0	1	1	6	—	—	—	—	—
2014–15	Lehigh Valley Phantoms	AHL	1	2	0	2	0	—	—	—	—	—
2014–15	Philadelphia Flyers	NHL	72	9	6	15	28	—	—	—	—	—
2015–16	Philadelphia Flyers	NHL	79	2	12	14	27	6	1	0	1	0
2016–17	Philadelphia Flyers	NHL	81	6	9	15	16	—	—	—	—	—
2017–18	Lukko	Liiga	27	6	10	16	10	—	—	—	—	—
2018–19	EC Red Bull Salzburg	EBEL	54	11	31	42	34	13	3	5	8	12
AHL totals			236	38	48	86	132	37	9	2	11	26
NHL totals			278	18	30	48	95	6	1	0	1	0

== Awards and honours ==
Award	Year
College
WCHA All-Tournament Team	2010
