= Evan Trupp =

American ice hockey player

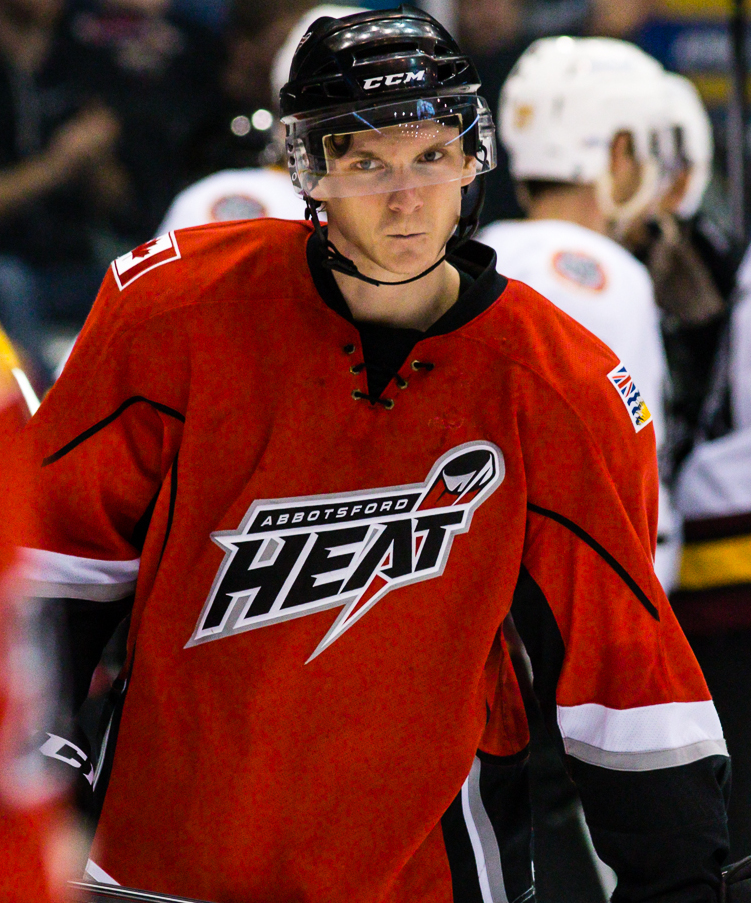
- Born: October 22, 1987 (age 39) Anchorage, Alaska, U.S.
- Height: 5 ft 9 in (175 cm)
- Weight: 175 lb (79 kg; 12 st 7 lb)
- Position: Forward
- Shot: Left
- Played for: Abbotsford Heat; Worcester Sharks; Chicago Wolves; Augsburger Panther; Iserlohn Roosters; Dornbirn Bulldogs
- NHL draft: Undrafted
- Playing career: 2011–2021

Evan Trupp (born October 22, 1987) is an American former professional ice hockey player who most notably played in the American Hockey League (AHL).

== Playing career ==
Trupp played two seasons of junior hockey for the Penticton Vees of the British Columbia Hockey League (BCHL) scoring a total of 129 points in 94 regular season games. Trupp was named BCHL (Interior Conference) Rookie of the Year in 2005–06.

Trupp then attended the University of North Dakota where he played four seasons (2007–2011) of NCAA hockey for North Dakota, scoring 40 goals and 68 assists for 108 points, while registering 90 penalty minutes in 157 games played. Trupp was part of the North Dakota team that won the 2010 WCHA Men's Ice Hockey Tournament for which he was named Tournament MVP and the 2011 WCHA Men's Ice Hockey Tournament.

Trupp started the 2011–12 season in the ECHL with the Cincinnati Cyclones, but on January 12, 2012, he was traded to the Bakersfield Condors.

On March 8, 2013, the 2012–13 ECHL trading deadline, the Condors moved Trupp to the Alaska Aces in exchange for Shawn Skelly and Chris Haltigin. The Aces announced on September 5, 2013, that they had re-signed Trupp for the 2013–14 season. Later in the season he made his AHL debut with affiliate, the Abbotsford Heat. After 17 games with the Heat, Trupp returned to the Aces to help capture the Kelly Cup.

On August 28, 2014, Trupp had signed a one-year AHL contract with the Worcester Sharks, an affiliate of the San Jose Sharks. In the 2014–15 season with the Sharks, Trupp enjoyed his most successful professional season, establishing an offensive presence with 40 points in 72 games.

On July 2, 2015, Trupp signed for his third AHL club, agreeing to a one-year deal with the Chicago Wolves. Unable to replicate his previous season totals, Trupp appeared in 59 games with the Wolves for 7 goals and 22 points from the checking line in the 2015–16 season.

As a free agent in the off-season, Trupp opted to leave the AHL and signed a one-year contract with German club, Augsburger Panther of the DEL on July 20, 2016. Following his second season with Augsburger in 2017–18 season, Trupp left as a free agent but continued in the DEL by signing a one-year deal with Iserlohn Roosters on April 6, 2018.

After three seasons in the DEL, Trupp left to sign a contract in the neighbouring EBEL agreeing to a one-year contract with the Dornbirn Bulldogs on June 19, 2019. In November 2020 he signs a contract with the German second tier hockey team Dresdner Eislöwen.

== Career statistics ==
			Regular season					Playoffs
Season	Team	League	GP	G	A	Pts	PIM	GP	G	A	Pts	PIM
2004–05	Des Moines Buccaneers	USHL	1	0	0	0	0	—	—	—	—	—
2005–06	Penticton Vees	BCHL	59	29	50	79	37	—	—	—	—	—
2006–07	Penticton Vees	BCHL	35	20	30	50	44	—	—	—	—	—
2007–08	University of North Dakota	WCHA	32	5	8	13	30	—	—	—	—	—
2008–09	University of North Dakota	WCHA	38	7	13	20	24	—	—	—	—	—
2009–10	University of North Dakota	WCHA	43	8	26	34	18	—	—	—	—	—
2010–11	University of North Dakota	WCHA	44	17	24	41	18	—	—	—	—	—
2011–12	Cincinnati Cyclones	ECHL	20	2	10	12	10	—	—	—	—	—
2011–12	Bakersfield Condors	ECHL	25	10	12	22	19	—	—	—	—	—
2012–13	Bakersfield Condors	ECHL	60	5	22	27	43	—	—	—	—	—
2012–13	Alaska Aces	ECHL	10	2	6	8	8	11	2	3	5	9
2013–14	Alaska Aces	ECHL	51	17	33	50	24	21	6	8	14	14
2013–14	Abbotsford Heat	AHL	17	1	6	7	10	—	—	—	—	—
2014–15	Worcester Sharks	AHL	72	16	24	40	26	4	0	0	0	17
2015–16	Chicago Wolves	AHL	59	7	15	22	17	—	—	—	—	—
2016–17	Augsburger Panther	DEL	43	10	26	36	16	2	0	0	0	0
2017–18	Augsburger Panther	DEL	51	7	23	30	16	—	—	—	—	—
2018–19	Iserlohn Roosters	DEL	49	6	29	35	40	—	—	—	—	—
2019–20	Dornbirn Bulldogs	EBEL	11	4	3	7	4	—	—	—	—	—
2020–21	Dresdner Eislöwen	DEL2	29	6	16	22	39	—	—	—	—	—
AHL totals			148	24	45	69	53	4	0	0	0	17

== Awards and achievements ==
- 2005–06 BCHL (Interior conference) Rookie of the Year
- 2009–10 NCAA (WCHA) Tournament Champion
- 2009–10 NCAA (WCHA) Tournament MVP
- 2010–11 NCAA (WCHA) Tournament Champion
- 2012–13 ECHL Brabham Cup (Regular season champion)
