= Bill Scott (ice hockey) =

Canadian ice hockey executive (born 1980)

- Born: c. 1980 (age 45–46); Unionville, Ontario, Canada
- Education: Michigan State University
- Occupations: Assistant General Manager (Edmonton); General Manager (Bakersfield)
- Years active: 2014 - present
- Employer(s): Edmonton Oilers; Bakersfield Condors
- Organization(s): National Hockey League; American Hockey League
- Spouse: Amy Scott
- Children: 2

William G. Scott Jr. (born c. 1980) is a Canadian ice hockey executive. He is the assistant general manager for the Edmonton Oilers of the National Hockey League (NHL).

Prior to joining the Oilers on April 21, 2014, Scott was the general manager for Oklahoma City Barons. When the Barons franchise relocated in 2015 and became the Bakersfield Condors, he stayed on as the team's general manager.
