= David Eddy (ice hockey) =

American professional ice hockey player

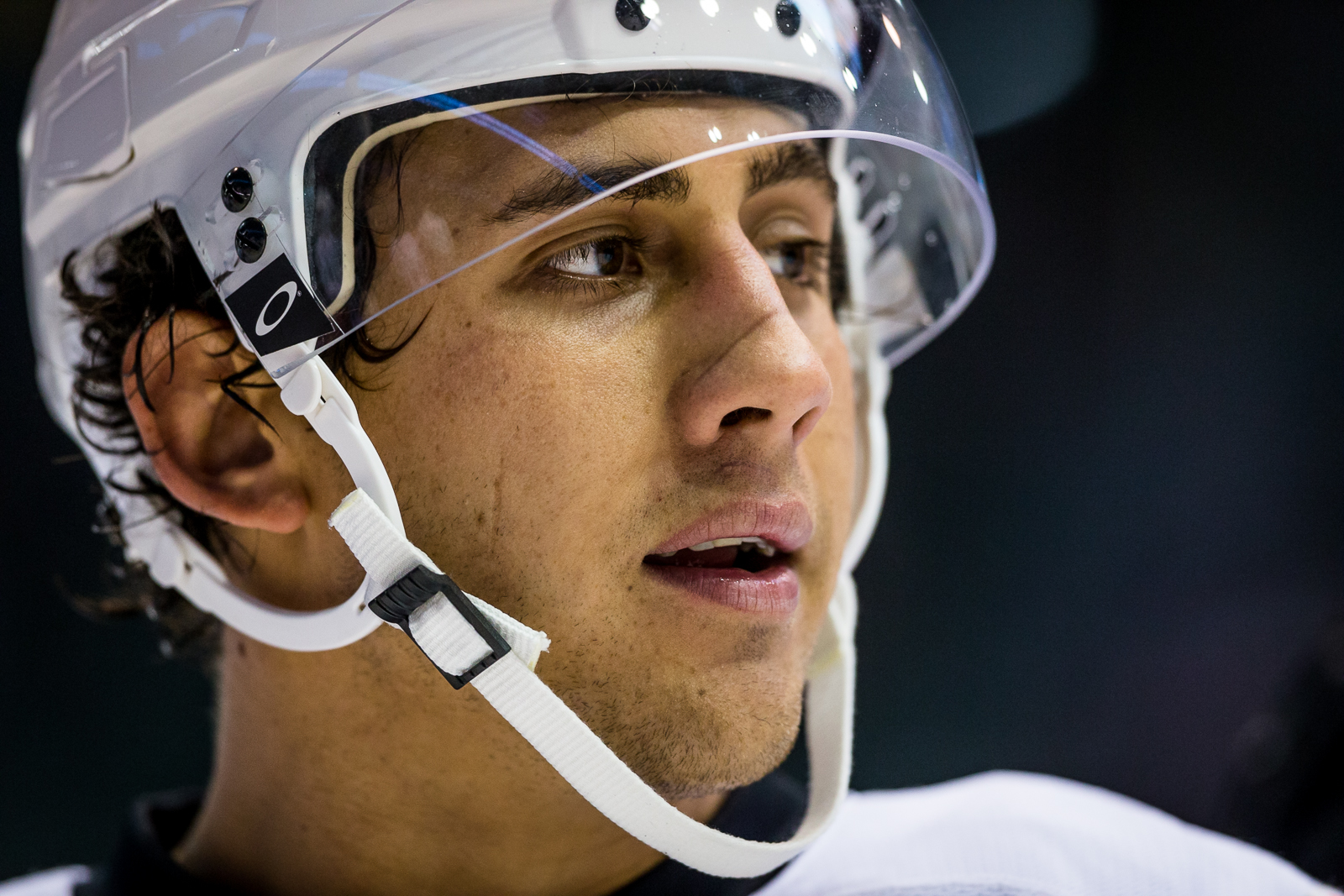
- Eddy with the Abbotsford Heat in 2013.
- Born: December 10, 1990 (age 35) Woodbury, Minnesota, U.S.
- Height: 5 ft 11 in (180 cm)
- Weight: 190 lb (86 kg; 13 st 8 lb)
- Position: Right wing
- Shot: Right
- Played for: Abbotsford Heat
- NHL draft: Undrafted
- Playing career: 2012–2016

David Eddy (born December 10, 1990) is an American former professional ice hockey player. He last played under contract with the Alaska Aces of the ECHL.

== Playing career ==
Eddy attended St. Cloud State University where he played three seasons (2009–2012) of NCAA college hockey with the St. Cloud State Huskies, scoring 30 goals and 35 assists for 65 points, while registering 81 penalty minutes in 92 games played.

On March 20, 2012, the Calgary Flames of the National Hockey League (NHL) signed Eddy as a free agent to a two-year, two-way contract, and he made his professional debut in the American Hockey League (AHL) with the Abbotsford Heat near the end of the 2011–12 AHL season.

Following the 2013–14 season, the Flames did not tender Eddy a qualifying offer and as a result he became an unrestricted free agent.

Eddy sat out the 2014–15 season due to injury. On August 18, 2015, in a return to health, Eddy signed a one-year contract in a return to the Alaska Aces of the ECHL.
