= Oklahoma City Barons =

American professional ice hockey team (2010–2015)

- City: Oklahoma City, Oklahoma
- League: American Hockey League
- Conference: Western Conference
- Division: West Division
- Founded: 1984
- Operated: 2010–2015
- Home arena: Cox Convention Center
- Colors: Blue, orange, white
- Owners: Oilers Entertainment Group; Prodigal, LLC (local management)
- Affiliates: Edmonton Oilers (NHL); Bakersfield Condors (ECHL)
- Website: http://www.okcbarons.com

Franchise history
- 1984–1988: Nova Scotia Oilers
- 1988–1996: Cape Breton Oilers
- 1996–2003: Hamilton Bulldogs
- 2003–2004: Toronto Roadrunners
- 2004–2005: Edmonton Road Runners
- 2010–2015: Oklahoma City Barons
- 2015–present: Bakersfield Condors

Championships
- Division titles: 1 (2011–12)

The Oklahoma City Barons were a professional ice hockey team in the American Hockey League (AHL). The team's first season was 2010–11. They played their home games at the Cox Convention Center, in Oklahoma City, Oklahoma.

== History ==
On February 9, 2010, the American Hockey League Board of Governors approved of the relocation of the Oilers' inactive AHL franchise to Oklahoma City, after a five-year dormancy. The franchise had gone through six incarnations, the first of which was the Nova Scotia Oilers and most recently the Edmonton Road Runners, who ceased play in 2005. The Barons were named through a fan contest. Before the Barons, the Cox Convention Center in Oklahoma City had also been the home to former Central Hockey League franchises, the Oklahoma City Stars and the Oklahoma City Blazers. Bob Funk Jr., who headed the former Blazers' ownership group, is also at the helm of Prodigal Hockey LLC, the Barons' ownership group.

Todd Nelson served as the Barons' first head coach with Gerry Fleming joining him as his assistant. Bill Scott, a former director of hockey operations for the AHL, served as the Barons' first general manager.

In December 2014, Nelson was promoted to the Oilers' coaching staff as head coach and Fleming being promoted to the Barons' head coach position.

After the team's inaugural season in 2010–11, the Barons finished in the bottom five in the league for average attendance, including worst in the league in 2012–13. On December 18, 2014, the Oilers and Barons announced that the Barons would cease operations after the current season citing continued financial losses stemming from poor attendance.

On January 29, 2015, the AHL announced that the Edmonton Oilers' AHL franchise would be located in Bakersfield, California, replacing the Barons beginning with the 2015–16 season. The Oilers' owned-and-operated Bakersfield Condors are part of a new Pacific Division that introduced the league to California.

== Team information ==
=== Logos and uniforms ===
The Oklahoma City Barons colors were midnight blue, copper and white (with red used for outlining) later on changed to blue, orange and white. This color palette was also used by the Edmonton Oilers between 1996 and 2011. The Barons' logo prominently features an oil derrick, symbolizing a rich tradition in the production of oil in the state of Oklahoma, and further showcasing the similarities between the cities of Edmonton and Oklahoma City.

Like the other 29 teams in the American Hockey League, the Oklahoma City Barons played in the Reebok EDGE style uniforms. The Barons' home uniform was a white jersey with a midnight blue collar and trim the white jersey, while their away uniform is a midnight blue jersey with a copper collar and trim, with the Barons logo placed on the front. These jerseys have been styled from the Edmonton Oilers' now-former away and alternate jerseys, respectively. The Barons' shoulder logos also include the Edmonton Oilers logo and the "OKC" secondary logo.

=== Mascot ===
The Oklahoma City Barons' official team mascot was a mountain lion, named Derrick. Derrick was officially introduced on July 27, 2010, after a lengthy "Name the Mascot" fan contest, which was held on the Barons' website. Derrick's role within the Barons' organization was to interact with fans; having his photo taken, meeting and greeting, and signing autographs during their home games. He also makes public appearances in and around Oklahoma City.

On February 19, 2012, the Barons introduced another mountain lion, named Bit, as a secondary mascot.

== Season-by-season results ==
Records as of May 20, 2015.

Regular Season											Playoffs				
Season	Games	Won	Lost	OTL	SOL	Points	PCT	Goals for	Goals against	Standing	Year	1st round	2nd round	3rd round	Finals
2010–11	80	40	29	2	9	91	.569	245	234	5th, West	2011	L, 2–4, HAM	—	—	—
2011–12	76	45	22	4	5	99	.651	215	176	1st, West	2012	W, 3–1, HOU	W, 4–1, SA	L, 1–4, TOR	—
2012–13	76	40	25	2	9	91	.599	240	228	3rd, South	2013	W, 3-2, CHA	W, 4-1, TEX	L, 3-4, GR	—
2013–14	76	36	29	2	9	83	.546	239	256	3rd, West	2014	L, 0–3, TEX	—	—	—
2014–15	76	41	27	5	3	90	.592	224	212	3rd, West	2015	W, 3-0, SA	L, 3-4, UTI	-	—
Totals	384	202	132	15	35	454	.591	1,163	1,106			5 Playoff Appearances			

== Players ==
=== Team captains ===
- Ben Ondrus, 2010–11
- Bryan Helmer, 2011–12
- Josh Green, 2012–13
- Anton Lander, 2013–15
- Ryan Hamilton, 2015

=== Notable alumni ===
List of Oklahoma City Barons alumni who played more than 100 games in Oklahoma City and 100 or more games in the National Hockey League.

- (United States) Mark Arcobello
- (Canada) Brandon Davidson
- (Canada) Taylor Fedun
- (Canada) Josh Green
- (Canada) Bryan Helmer
- (Canada) Brad Hunt
- (Sweden) Anton Lander
- (Slovakia) Martin Marincin
- (United States) Tyler Pitlick
- (United States) Chris VandeVelde

== Individual award winners ==
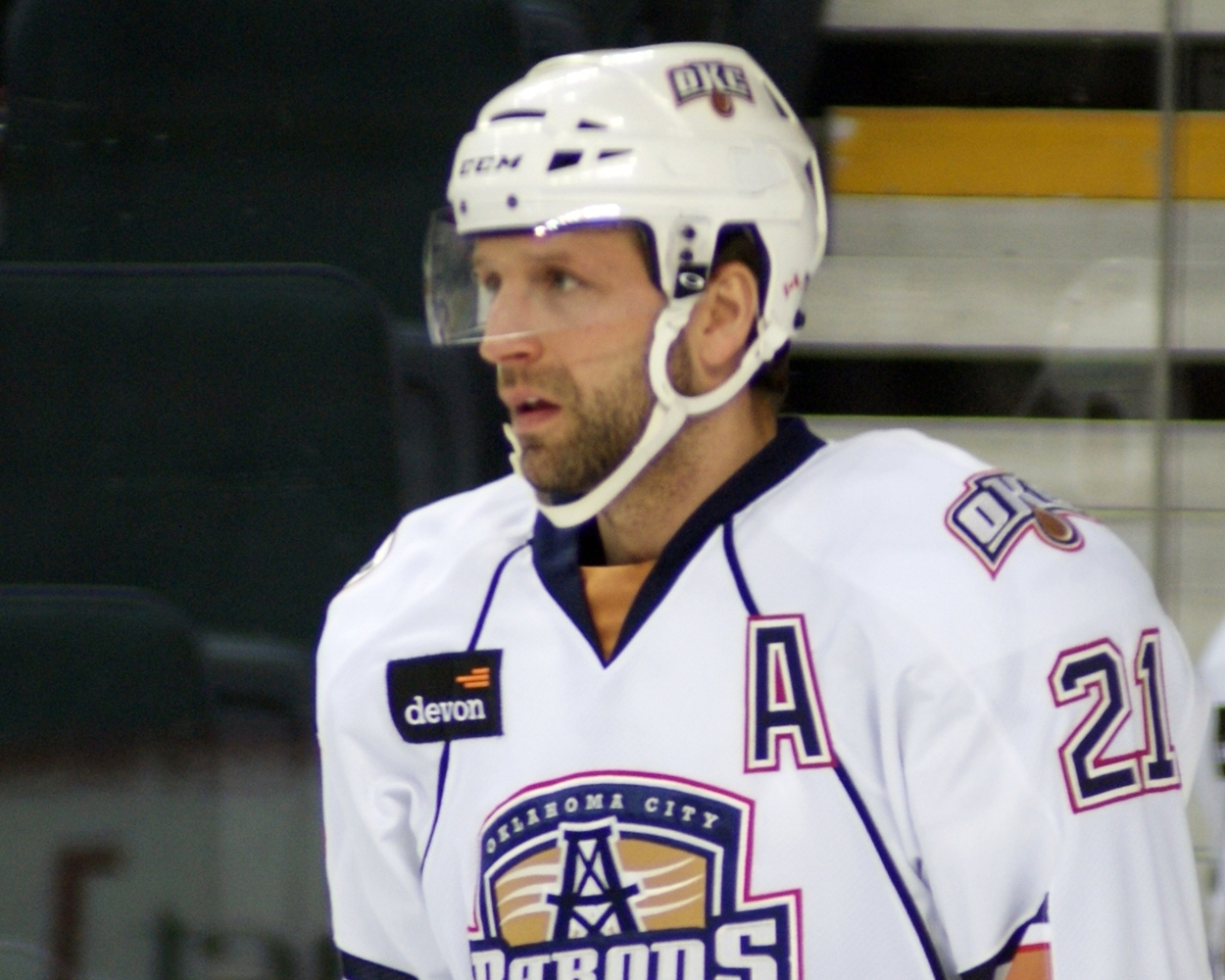
Bryan Helmer, February 2011

Willie Marshall Award (Leading Goal Scorer)

- Colin McDonald, 2010–11

Eddie Shore Award (Best Defenseman)

- Justin Schultz, 2012–13

Aldege "Baz" Bastien Memorial Award (Best Goaltender)

- Yann Danis, 2011–12

Fred T. Hunt Memorial Award

- Brandon Davidson, 2012–13
- Bryan Helmer, 2010–11

== Team records ==
=== Single season ===
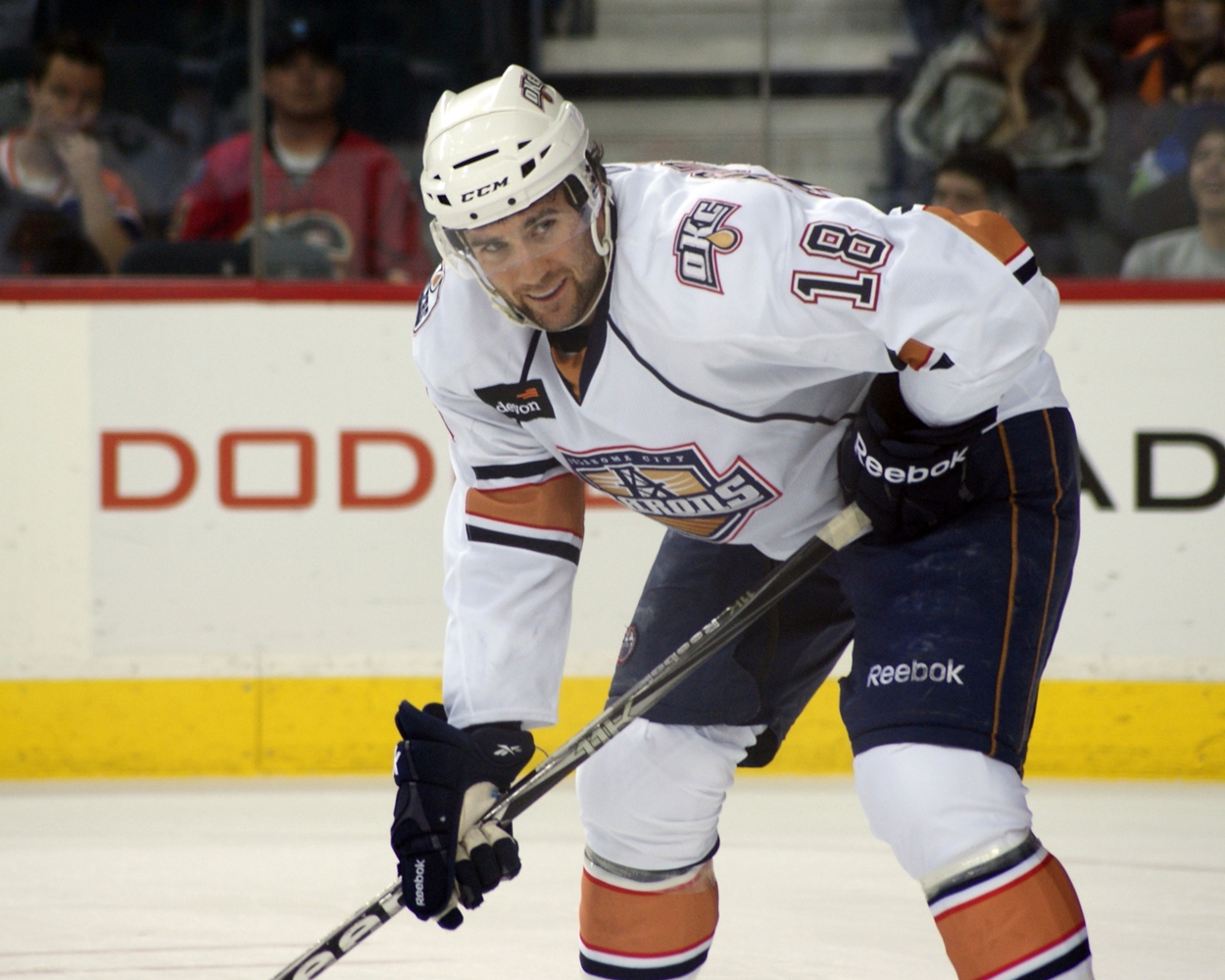
Colin McDonald, February 2011

Goals: Colin McDonald, 42 (2010–11)
Assists: Brad Moran, 52 (2010–11)
Points: Alexandre Giroux, 78 (2010–11)
Penalty minutes: Triston Grant, 163 (2011–12)
Wins: Yann Danis, 26 (2011–12) & Richard Bachman, 26 (2013–14)
Shutouts: Yann Danis, 5 (2011-12)
GAA: Yann Danis, 2.07 (2011–12)
SV%: Yann Danis, .924 (2011–12)

=== Career ===
Career games: Curtis Hamilton, 208 (2011–15)
Career goals: Mark Arcobello, 60 (2010–14)
Career assists: Mark Arcobello, 101 (2010–14)
Career points: Mark Arcobello, 161 (2010–14)
Career penalty minutes: Alex Plante, 336 (2010–13)
Career wins: Yann Danis, 52 (2011–13)
Career shutouts: Yann Danis, 7 (2011–13)
