= 2022–23 Vancouver Canucks season =

NHL hockey team season

2022–23 Vancouver Canucks
- Division: 6th Pacific
- Conference: 11th Western
- 2022–23 record: 38–37–7
- Home record: 19–20–2
- Road record: 19–17–5
- Goals for: 276
- Goals against: 298

Team information
- General manager: Patrik Allvin
- Coach: Bruce Boudreau (Oct. 12 – Jan. 22); Rick Tocchet (Jan. 22 – Apr. 13)
- Captain: Bo Horvat (Oct. 12 – Jan. 30); Vacant (Jan. 30 – Apr. 13)
- Alternate captains: Oliver Ekman-Larsson; Quinn Hughes (Feb–Apr); J. T. Miller; Tyler Myers (Oct–Feb); Elias Pettersson (Feb–Apr)
- Arena: Rogers Arena
- Average attendance: 18,702
- Minor league affiliate: Abbotsford Canucks (AHL)

Team leaders
- Goals: Andrei Kuzmenko; Elias Pettersson (39)
- Assists: Quinn Hughes (69)
- Points: Elias Pettersson (102)
- Penalty minutes: Tyler Myers (76)
- Plus/minus: Elias Pettersson (+16)
- Wins: Thatcher Demko (14)
- Goals against average: Arturs Silovs (2.75)

The 2022–23 Vancouver Canucks season was the 53rd season for the National Hockey League (NHL) franchise that was established on May 22, 1970. The Canucks were eliminated from playoff contention on April 2, 2023, when the Winnipeg Jets defeated the New Jersey Devils.

== Standings ==
=== Divisional standings ===
Pacific Division
| Pos | Team | GP | W | L | OTL | RW | GF | GA | GD | Pts |
|---|---|---|---|---|---|---|---|---|---|---|
| 1 | z – Vegas Golden Knights | 82 | 51 | 22 | 9 | 38 | 272 | 229 | +43 | 111 |
| 2 | x – Edmonton Oilers | 82 | 50 | 23 | 9 | 45 | 325 | 260 | +65 | 109 |
| 3 | x – Los Angeles Kings | 82 | 47 | 25 | 10 | 37 | 280 | 257 | +23 | 104 |
| 4 | x – Seattle Kraken | 82 | 46 | 28 | 8 | 37 | 289 | 256 | +33 | 100 |
| 5 | Calgary Flames | 82 | 38 | 27 | 17 | 31 | 260 | 252 | +8 | 93 |
| 6 | Vancouver Canucks | 82 | 38 | 37 | 7 | 24 | 276 | 298 | −22 | 83 |
| 7 | San Jose Sharks | 82 | 22 | 44 | 16 | 16 | 234 | 321 | −87 | 60 |
| 8 | Anaheim Ducks | 82 | 23 | 47 | 12 | 13 | 209 | 338 | −129 | 58 |

Source: National Hockey League
Rules for classification: 1) Fewer number of games played (GP, only during regular season); 2) Greater number of regulation wins (RW); 3) Greater number of wins in regulation and overtime, excluding shootout wins (ROW); 4) Greater number of total wins, including shootouts (W); 5) Greater number of points earned in head-to-head play; if teams played an uneven number of head-to-head games, the result of the first game on the home ice of the team with the extra home game is discarded; 6) Greater goal differential (GD); 7) Greater number of goals scored (GF)
x – Clinched playoff spot; z – Clinched conference

=== Conference standings ===
Western Conference Wild Card
| Pos | Div | Team | GP | W | L | OTL | RW | GF | GA | GD | Pts |
|---|---|---|---|---|---|---|---|---|---|---|---|
| 1 | PA | x – Seattle Kraken | 82 | 46 | 28 | 8 | 37 | 289 | 256 | +33 | 100 |
| 2 | CE | x – Winnipeg Jets | 82 | 46 | 33 | 3 | 36 | 247 | 225 | +22 | 95 |
| 3 | PA | Calgary Flames | 82 | 38 | 27 | 17 | 31 | 260 | 252 | +8 | 93 |
| 4 | CE | Nashville Predators | 82 | 42 | 32 | 8 | 29 | 229 | 238 | −9 | 92 |
| 5 | PA | Vancouver Canucks | 82 | 38 | 37 | 7 | 24 | 276 | 298 | −22 | 83 |
| 6 | CE | St. Louis Blues | 82 | 37 | 38 | 7 | 27 | 263 | 301 | −38 | 81 |
| 7 | CE | Arizona Coyotes | 82 | 28 | 40 | 14 | 20 | 228 | 299 | −71 | 70 |
| 8 | PA | San Jose Sharks | 82 | 22 | 44 | 16 | 16 | 234 | 321 | −87 | 60 |
| 9 | CE | Chicago Blackhawks | 82 | 26 | 49 | 7 | 18 | 204 | 301 | −97 | 59 |
| 10 | PA | Anaheim Ducks | 82 | 23 | 47 | 12 | 13 | 209 | 338 | −129 | 58 |

Source: National Hockey League
Rules for classification: 1) Fewer number of games played (GP, only during regular season); 2) Greater number of regulation wins (RW); 3) Greater number of wins in regulation and overtime, excluding shootout wins (ROW); 4) Greater number of total wins, including shootouts (W); 5) Greater number of points earned in head-to-head play; if teams played an uneven number of head-to-head games, the result of the first game on the home ice of the team with the extra home game is discarded; 6) Greater goal differential (GD); 7) Greater number of goals scored (GF)
x – Clinched playoff spot

== Schedule and results ==
=== Preseason ===
The preseason schedule was published on July 5, 2022.

2022 preseason game log: 2–3–2 (Home: 2–0–2; Road: 0–3–0)
| # | Date | Visitor | Score | Home | OT | Decision | Attendance | Record | Recap |
|---|---|---|---|---|---|---|---|---|---|
| 1 | September 25^{[A]} | Calgary | 3–2 | Vancouver | OT | Silovs | 17,598 | 0–0–1 |
| 2 | September 25^{[A]} | Vancouver | 0–4 | Calgary | | Delia | 5,000 | 0–1–1 |
| 3 | September 29 | Seattle | 4–3 | Vancouver | OT | Silovs | 16,480 | 0–1–2 |
| 4 | October 1 | Vancouver | 0–4 | Seattle | | Demko | 17,151 | 0–2–2 |
| 5 | October 3 | Vancouver | 2–7 | Edmonton | | Delia | 15,716 | 0–3–2 |
| 6 | October 5^{[a]} | Edmonton | 4–5 | Vancouver | | Martin | 7,046 | 1–3–2 |
| 7 | October 7 | Arizona | 0–4 | Vancouver | | Demko | 18,672 | 2–3–2 |
Notes:^{A} Indicates split-squad.^{a} Game was played at Abbotsford Centre in Abbotsford, British Columbia.

=== Regular season ===
The regular season schedule was published on July 6, 2022.

2022–23 game log

October: 2–5–2 (Home: 1–2–0; Road: 1–3–2)
| # | Date | Visitor | Score | Home | OT | Decision | Attendance | Record | Pts | Recap |
|---|---|---|---|---|---|---|---|---|---|---|
| 1 | October 12 | Vancouver | 3–5 | Edmonton | | Demko | 18,347 | 0–1–0 | 0 |
| 2 | October 15 | Vancouver | 2–3 | Philadelphia | | Demko | 14,837 | 0–2–0 | 0 |
| 3 | October 17 | Vancouver | 4–6 | Washington | | Demko | 18,573 | 0–3–0 | 0 |
| 4 | October 18 | Vancouver | 3–4 | Columbus | OT | Martin | 14,060 | 0–3–1 | 1 |
| 5 | October 20 | Vancouver | 3–4 | Minnesota | OT | Demko | 17,323 | 0–3–2 | 2 |
| 6 | October 22 | Buffalo | 5–1 | Vancouver | | Demko | 18,809 | 0–4–2 | 2 |
| 7 | October 24 | Carolina | 3–2 | Vancouver | | Demko | 18,775 | 0–5–2 | 2 |
| 8 | October 27 | Vancouver | 5–4 | Seattle | | Demko | 17,151 | 1–5–2 | 4 |
| 9 | October 28 | Pittsburgh | 1–5 | Vancouver | | Martin | 18,528 | 2–5–2 | 6 |

November: 7–6–1 (Home: 2–3–1; Road: 5–3–0)
| # | Date | Visitor | Score | Home | OT | Decision | Attendance | Record | Pts | Recap |
|---|---|---|---|---|---|---|---|---|---|---|
| 10 | November 1 | New Jersey | 5–2 | Vancouver | | Demko | 18,548 | 2–6–2 | 6 |
| 11 | November 3 | Anaheim | 5–8 | Vancouver | | Martin | 18,760 | 3–6–2 | 8 |
| 12 | November 5 | Nashville | 4–3 | Vancouver | SO | Demko | 18,855 | 3–6–3 | 9 |
| 13 | November 8 | Vancouver | 6–4 | Ottawa | | Martin | 13,351 | 4–6–3 | 11 |
| 14 | November 9 | Vancouver | 2–5 | Montreal | | Demko | 21,105 | 4–7–3 | 11 |
| 15 | November 12 | Vancouver | 2–3 | Toronto | | Martin | 19,497 | 4–8–3 | 11 |
| 16 | November 13 | Vancouver | 2–5 | Boston | | Demko | 17,850 | 4–9–3 | 11 |
| 17 | November 15 | Vancouver | 5–4 | Buffalo | | Martin | 11,130 | 5–9–3 | 13 |
| 18 | November 18 | Los Angeles | 1–4 | Vancouver | | Demko | 18,841 | 6–9–3 | 15 |
| 19 | November 21 | Vegas | 5–4 | Vancouver | | Demko | 18,558 | 6–10–3 | 15 |
| 20 | November 23 | Vancouver | 4–3 | Colorado | | Martin | 18,132 | 7–10–3 | 17 |
| 21 | November 26 | Vancouver | 5–1 | Vegas | | Martin | 18,004 | 8–10–3 | 19 |
| 22 | November 27 | Vancouver | 4–3 | San Jose | OT | Demko | 11,307 | 9–10–3 | 21 |
| 23 | November 29 | Washington | 5–1 | Vancouver | | Martin | 18,179 | 9–11–3 | 21 |

December: 7–6–0 (Home: 4–4–0; Road: 3–2–0)
| # | Date | Visitor | Score | Home | OT | Decision | Attendance | Record | Pts | Recap |
|---|---|---|---|---|---|---|---|---|---|---|
| 24 | December 1 | Florida | 5–1 | Vancouver | | Demko | 18,052 | 9–12–3 | 21 |
| 25 | December 3 | Arizona | 2–3 | Vancouver | OT | Martin | 18,516 | 10–12–3 | 23 |
| 26 | December 5 | Montreal | 6–7 | Vancouver | OT | Delia | 18,420 | 11–12–3 | 25 |
| 27 | December 7 | Vancouver | 6–5 | San Jose | OT | Martin | 11,492 | 12–12–3 | 27 |
| 28 | December 10 | Minnesota | 3–0 | Vancouver | | Martin | 18,526 | 12–13–3 | 27 |
| 29 | December 14 | Vancouver | 4–3 | Calgary | SO | Martin | 17,552 | 13–13–3 | 29 |
| 30 | December 17 | Winnipeg | 5–1 | Vancouver | | Martin | 18,487 | 13–14–3 | 29 |
| 31 | December 19 | St. Louis | 5–1 | Vancouver | | Martin | 18,692 | 13–15–3 | 29 |
| 32 | December 22 | Seattle | 5–6 | Vancouver | SO | Martin | 18,794 | 14–15–3 | 31 |
| 33 | December 23 | Vancouver | 5–2 | Edmonton | | Delia | 18,347 | 15–15–3 | 33 |
| 34 | December 27 | San Jose | 2–6 | Vancouver | | Martin | 18,875 | 16–15–3 | 35 |
| 35 | December 29 | Vancouver | 2–4 | Winnipeg | | Delia | 15,325 | 16–16–3 | 35 |
| 36 | December 31 | Vancouver | 2–3 | Calgary | | Martin | 19,289 | 16–17–3 | 35 |

January: 4–9–0 (Home: 3–4–0; Road: 1–5–0)
| # | Date | Visitor | Score | Home | OT | Decision | Attendance | Record | Pts | Recap |
|---|---|---|---|---|---|---|---|---|---|---|
| 37 | January 3 | NY Islanders | 6–2 | Vancouver | | Martin | 18,912 | 16–18–3 | 35 |
| 38 | January 5 | Colorado | 2–4 | Vancouver | | Delia | 18,706 | 17–18–3 | 37 |
| 39 | January 8 | Vancouver | 4–7 | Winnipeg | | Martin | 14,206 | 17–19–3 | 37 |
| 40 | January 10 | Vancouver | 4–5 | Pittsburgh | | Martin | 17,986 | 17–20–3 | 37 |
| 41 | January 12 | Vancouver | 4–5 | Tampa Bay | | Delia | 19,092 | 17–21–3 | 37 |
| 42 | January 14 | Vancouver | 3–4 | Florida | | Martin | 17,584 | 17–22–3 | 37 |
| 43 | January 15 | Vancouver | 4–3 | Carolina | SO | Delia | 18,680 | 18–22–3 | 39 |
| 44 | January 18 | Tampa Bay | 5–2 | Vancouver | | Martin | 18,792 | 18–23–3 | 39 |
| 45 | January 20 | Colorado | 4–1 | Vancouver | | Delia | 18,813 | 18–24–3 | 39 |
| 46 | January 21 | Edmonton | 4–2 | Vancouver | | Martin | 18,977 | 18–25–3 | 39 |
| 47 | January 24 | Chicago | 2–5 | Vancouver | | Delia | 18,988 | 19–25–3 | 41 |
| 48 | January 25 | Vancouver | 1–6 | Seattle | | Martin | 17,151 | 19–26–3 | 41 |
| 49 | January 27 | Columbus | 2–5 | Vancouver | | Delia | 18,700 | 20–26–3 | 43 |

February: 4–5–2 (Home: 1–3–0; Road: 3–2–2)
| # | Date | Visitor | Score | Home | OT | Decision | Attendance | Record | Pts | Recap |
|---|---|---|---|---|---|---|---|---|---|---|
| 50 | February 6 | Vancouver | 4–5 | New Jersey | OT | Delia | 14,630 | 20–26–4 | 44 |
| 51 | February 8 | Vancouver | 3–4 | NY Rangers | | Martin | 18,006 | 20–27–4 | 44 |
| 52 | February 9 | Vancouver | 6–5 | NY Islanders | | Delia | 17,255 | 21–27–4 | 46 |
| 53 | February 11 | Vancouver | 2–5 | Detroit | | Martin | 19,515 | 21–28–4 | 46 |
| 54 | February 13 | Detroit | 6–1 | Vancouver | | Delia | 18,465 | 21–29–4 | 46 |
| 55 | February 15 | NY Rangers | 6–4 | Vancouver | | Silovs | 18,404 | 21–30–4 | 46 |
| 56 | February 18 | Philadelphia | 2–6 | Vancouver | | Silovs | 18,799 | 22–30–4 | 48 |
| 57 | February 21 | Vancouver | 4–5 | Nashville | SO | Delia | 17,161 | 22–30–5 | 49 |
| 58 | February 23 | Vancouver | 3–2 | St. Louis | OT | Silovs | 18,096 | 23–30–5 | 51 |
| 59 | February 25 | Boston | 3–1 | Vancouver | | Silovs | 18,722 | 23–31–5 | 51 |
| 60 | February 27 | Vancouver | 5–4 | Dallas | OT | Demko | 17,876 | 24–31–5 | 53 |

March: 10–3–2 (Home: 6–2–1; Road: 4–1–1)
| # | Date | Visitor | Score | Home | OT | Decision | Attendance | Record | Pts | Recap |
|---|---|---|---|---|---|---|---|---|---|---|
| 61 | March 2 | Minnesota | 2–1 | Vancouver | | Demko | 18,903 | 24–32–5 | 53 |
| 62 | March 4 | Toronto | 1–4 | Vancouver | | Demko | 18,905 | 25–32–5 | 55 |
| 63 | March 6 | Nashville | 3–4 | Vancouver | SO | Silovs | 18,525 | 26–32–5 | 57 |
| 64 | March 8 | Anaheim | 2–3 | Vancouver | OT | Demko | 18,617 | 27–32–5 | 59 |
| 65 | March 11 | Ottawa | 2–5 | Vancouver | | Demko | 18,813 | 28–32–5 | 61 |
| 66 | March 14 | Dallas | 2–5 | Vancouver | | Demko | 18,794 | 29–32–5 | 63 |
| 67 | March 16 | Vancouver | 2–3 | Arizona | | Demko | 4,600 | 29–33–5 | 63 |
| 68 | March 18 | Vancouver | 3–2 | Los Angeles | SO | Demko | 18,230 | 30–33–5 | 65 |
| 69 | March 19 | Vancouver | 2–1 | Anaheim | | Delia | 14,842 | 31–33–5 | 67 |
| 70 | March 21 | Vegas | 4–3 | Vancouver | | Demko | 18,757 | 31–34–5 | 67 |
| 71 | March 23 | San Jose | 2–7 | Vancouver | | Demko | 18,919 | 32–34–5 | 69 |
| 72 | March 25 | Vancouver | 3–1 | Dallas | | Demko | 18,532 | 33–34–5 | 71 |
| 73 | March 26 | Vancouver | 4–2 | Chicago | | Delia | 18,276 | 34–34–5 | 73 |
| 74 | March 28 | Vancouver | 5–6 | St. Louis | OT | Demko | 18,096 | 34–34–6 | 74 |
| 75 | March 31 | Calgary | 5–4 | Vancouver | OT | Demko | 18,811 | 34–34–7 | 75 |

April: 4–3–0 (Home: 2–2–0; Road: 2–1–0)
| # | Date | Visitor | Score | Home | OT | Decision | Attendance | Record | Pts | Recap |
|---|---|---|---|---|---|---|---|---|---|---|
| 76 | April 2 | Los Angeles | 4–1 | Vancouver | | Demko | 18,725 | 34–35–7 | 75 |
| 77 | April 4 | Seattle | 5–2 | Vancouver | | Delia | 18,722 | 34–36–7 | 75 |
| 78 | April 6 | Chicago | 0–3 | Vancouver | | Demko | 18,945 | 35–36–7 | 77 |
| 79 | April 8 | Calgary | 2–3 | Vancouver | SO | Demko | 18,852 | 36–36–7 | 79 |
| 80 | April 10 | Vancouver | 0–3 | Los Angeles | | Delia | 18,230 | 36–37–7 | 79 |
| 81 | April 11 | Vancouver | 3–2 | Anaheim | | Demko | 14,803 | 37–37–7 | 81 |
| 82 | April 13 | Vancouver | 5–4 | Arizona | OT | Delia | 4,600 | 38–37–7 | 83 |

Legend: Win (2 points) Loss (0 points) Overtime/shootout loss (1 point)

== Player statistics ==
=== Skaters ===
Regular season
| Player | GP | G | A | Pts | +/− | PIM |
|---|---|---|---|---|---|---|
| Elias Pettersson | 80 | 39 | 63 | 102 | +16 | 14 |
| J. T. Miller | 81 | 32 | 50 | 82 | −7 | 60 |
| Quinn Hughes | 78 | 7 | 69 | 76 | +15 | 34 |
| Andrei Kuzmenko | 81 | 39 | 35 | 74 | +9 | 8 |
| Brock Boeser | 74 | 18 | 37 | 55 | −20 | 24 |
| Bo Horvat^{‡} | 49 | 31 | 23 | 54 | +3 | 12 |
| Conor Garland | 81 | 17 | 29 | 46 | −5 | 31 |
| Ilya Mikheyev | 46 | 13 | 15 | 28 | +3 | 2 |
| Dakota Joshua | 79 | 11 | 12 | 23 | −16 | 60 |
| Oliver Ekman-Larsson | 54 | 2 | 20 | 22 | −24 | 22 |
| Luke Schenn^{‡} | 55 | 3 | 18 | 21 | +9 | 71 |
| Anthony Beauvillier^{†} | 33 | 9 | 11 | 20 | −6 | 14 |
| Sheldon Dries | 63 | 11 | 6 | 17 | −9 | 29 |
| Tyler Myers | 78 | 1 | 16 | 17 | −16 | 76 |
| Nils Aman | 68 | 4 | 12 | 16 | −12 | 18 |
| Ethan Bear^{†} | 61 | 3 | 13 | 16 | +6 | 25 |
| Phillip Di Giuseppe | 30 | 6 | 6 | 12 | −1 | 14 |
| Nils Hoglander | 25 | 3 | 6 | 9 | −4 | 6 |
| Jack Studnicka^{†} | 47 | 4 | 4 | 8 | −11 | 12 |
| Vasily Podkolzin | 39 | 4 | 3 | 7 | −5 | 9 |
| Curtis Lazar^{‡} | 45 | 3 | 2 | 5 | −5 | 14 |
| Kyle Burroughs | 48 | 2 | 3 | 5 | −4 | 62 |
| Tanner Pearson | 14 | 1 | 4 | 5 | −9 | 21 |
| Riley Stillman^{‡} | 32 | 0 | 5 | 5 | −14 | 23 |
| Lane Pederson | 11 | 1 | 2 | 3 | +3 | 15 |
| Guillaume Brisebois | 17 | 1 | 2 | 3 | −2 | 6 |
| Akito Hirose | 7 | 0 | 3 | 3 | −1 | 4 |
| Christian Wolanin | 16 | 0 | 3 | 3 | +5 | 4 |
| Vitali Kravtsov^{†} | 16 | 1 | 1 | 2 | −3 | 4 |
| Jack Rathbone | 11 | 1 | 1 | 2 | −1 | 2 |
| Cole McWard | 5 | 1 | 0 | 1 | 0 | 0 |
| Aidan McDonough | 6 | 1 | 0 | 1 | −2 | 2 |
| Travis Dermott | 11 | 1 | 0 | 1 | −4 | 2 |
| Aatu Raty^{†} | 3 | 0 | 1 | 1 | −1 | 0 |
| Filip Hronek^{†} | 4 | 0 | 1 | 1 | −1 | 0 |
| Will Lockwood^{‡} | 13 | 0 | 1 | 1 | −7 | 0 |
| Tucker Poolman | 3 | 0 | 1 | 1 | +1 | 0 |
| Noah Juulsen | 12 | 0 | 0 | 0 | +1 | 6 |

=== Goaltenders ===
Regular season
| Player | GP | GS | TOI | W | L | OT | GA | GAA | SA | SV% | SO | G | A | PIM |
|---|---|---|---|---|---|---|---|---|---|---|---|---|---|---|
| Thatcher Demko | 32 | 32 | 1,878:31 | 14 | 14 | 4 | 99 | 3.16 | 1,005 | .901 | 1 | 0 | 1 | 4 |
| Spencer Martin | 29 | 27 | 1,610:11 | 11 | 15 | 1 | 107 | 3.99 | 830 | .871 | 0 | 0 | 0 | 0 |
| Collin Delia | 20 | 18 | 1,135:40 | 10 | 6 | 2 | 62 | 3.28 | 526 | .882 | 0 | 0 | 1 | 0 |
| Arturs Silovs | 5 | 5 | 305:56 | 3 | 2 | 0 | 14 | 2.75 | 152 | .908 | 0 | 0 | 0 | 0 |

^{†}Denotes player spent time with another team before joining the Canucks. Stats reflect time with the Canucks only.
^{‡}Denotes player was traded mid-season. Stats reflect time with the Canucks only.
Bold/italics denotes franchise record.

== Awards and honours ==
=== Awards ===
Regular season
| Player | Award | Awarded | Ref |
|---|---|---|---|
| Elias Pettersson | NHL Third Star of the Week | December 24, 2022 | |
| Elias Pettersson | NHL All-Star game selection | January 5, 2023 | |
| Bo Horvat | NHL All-Star game selection | January 19, 2023 | |

=== Milestones ===
Regular season
| Player | Milestone | Reached | Ref |
|---|---|---|---|
| Nils Aman | 1st career NHL game | October 12, 2022 | |
| Andrei Kuzmenko | 1st career NHL game 1st career NHL goal 1st career NHL point | October 12, 2022 | |
| Andrei Kuzmenko | 1st career NHL assist | October 17, 2022 | |
| Elias Pettersson | 100th career NHL goal | October 18, 2022 | |
| Nils Aman | 1st career NHL goal 1st career NHL assist 1st career NHL point | October 20, 2022 | |
| Guillaume Brisebois | 1st career NHL assist 1st career NHL point | October 28, 2022 | |
| Andrei Kuzmenko | 1st career NHL hat-trick | November 3, 2022 | |
| Bo Horvat | 200th career NHL assist | November 5, 2022 | |
| Will Lockwood | 1st career NHL assist 1st career NHL point | November 15, 2022 | |
| Ethan Bear | 200th career NHL game | November 21, 2022 | |
| J.T. Miller | 300th career NHL assist | December 5, 2022 | |
| Bo Horvat | 600th career NHL game | December 10, 2022 | |
| Bo Horvat | 400th career NHL point | December 23, 2022 | |
| Luke Schenn | 900th career NHL game | January 3, 2023 | |
| Oliver Ekman-Larsson | 300th career NHL assist | January 5, 2023 | |
| Bo Horvat | 200th career NHL goal | January 14, 2023 | |
| Ilya Mikheyev | 100th career NHL point | January 27, 2023 | |
| J.T. Miller | 500th career NHL point | February 8, 2023 | |
| Oliver Ekman-Larsson | 900th career NHL game | February 11, 2023 | |
| Vasily Podkolzin | 100th career NHL game | February 13, 2023 | |
| Conor Garland | 100th career NHL assist | February 13, 2023 | |
| Arturs Silovs | 1st career NHL game | February 15, 2023 | |
| Arturs Silovs | 1st career NHL win | February 18, 2023 | |
| Elias Pettersson | 300th career NHL game | February 21, 2023 | |
| Sheldon Dries | 100th career NHL game | February 27, 2023 | |
| Conor Garland | 300th career NHL game | February 27, 2023 | |
| Aatu Räty | 1st career NHL assist | February 27, 2023 | |
| Dakota Joshua | 100th career NHL game | March 2, 2023 | |
| Quinn Hughes | 200th career NHL assist | March 4, 2023 | |
| Tyler Myers | 900th career NHL game | March 6, 2023 | |
| Elias Pettersson | 300th career NHL point | March 6, 2023 | |
| J.T. Miller | 700th career NHL game | March 8, 2023 | |
| Brock Boeser | 300th career NHL point | March 14, 2023 | |
| Guillaume Brisebois | 1st career NHL goal | March 14, 2023 | |
| Aidan McDonough | 1st career NHL game | March 26, 2023 | |
| Aidan McDonough | 1st career NHL goal 1st career NHL point | March 31, 2023 | |
| Cole McWard | 1st career NHL game | April 6, 2023 | |
| Cole McWard | 1st career NHL goal 1st career NHL point | April 8, 2023 | |
| J.T. Miller | 200th career NHL goal | April 11, 2023 | |
| Conor Garland | 1st career NHL hat-trick | April 13, 2023 | |

=== Records ===
Regular season
| Player | Record | Date | Ref |
|---|---|---|---|
| Quinn Hughes | Fastest defenseman in NHL history to record 200 assists (263 games) | March 4, 2023 | |

== Transactions ==
The Canucks have been involved in the following transactions during the 2022–23 season.

Key:

† Contract is entry-level.
‡ Contract initially takes effect in the 2023–24 season.

=== Trades ===
| Date | Details | | Ref |
|---|---|---|---|
| October 7, 2022 | To Chicago Blackhawks Jason Dickinson; 2nd-round pick in 2024 | To Vancouver Canucks Riley Stillman | |
| October 27, 2022 | To Boston Bruins Michael DiPietro; Jonathan Myrenberg | To Vancouver Canucks Jack Studnicka | |
| October 28, 2022 | To Carolina Hurricanes 5th-round pick in 2023 | To Vancouver Canucks Ethan Bear; Lane Pederson | |
| January 30, 2023 | To New York Islanders Bo Horvat | To Vancouver Canucks Anthony Beauvillier; Aatu Raty; Conditional 1st-round pick in 2023 | |
| February 25, 2023 | To New York Rangers Will Lockwood; 7th-round pick in 2026 | To Vancouver Canucks Vitali Kravtsov | |
| February 27, 2023 | To Buffalo Sabres Riley Stillman | To Vancouver Canucks Josh Bloom | |
| March 1, 2023 | To Toronto Maple Leafs Luke Schenn | To Vancouver Canucks 3rd-round pick in 2023 | |
| March 1, 2023 | To Detroit Red Wings NYI conditional 1st-round pick in 2023; 2nd-round pick in 2023 | To Vancouver Canucks Filip Hronek; 4th-round pick in 2023 | |
| March 3, 2023 | To New Jersey Devils Curtis Lazar | To Vancouver Canucks 4th-round pick in 2024 | |
| March 3, 2023 | To New York Rangers Wyatt Kalynuk | To Vancouver Canucks Future considerations | |

=== Players acquired ===
| Date | Player | Former team | Term | Via | Ref |
|---|---|---|---|---|---|
| July 13, 2022 | Collin Delia | Chicago Blackhawks | 1-year | Free agency | |
| July 13, 2022 | Dakota Joshua | St. Louis Blues | 2-year | Free agency | |
| July 13, 2022 | Wyatt Kalynuk | Chicago Blackhawks | 1-year | Free agency | |
| July 13, 2022 | Andrei Kuzmenko | SKA St. Petersburg (KHL) | 1-year† | Free agency | |
| July 13, 2022 | Curtis Lazar | Boston Bruins | 3-year | Free agency | |
| July 13, 2022 | Ilya Mikheyev | Toronto Maple Leafs | 4-year | Free agency | |
| July 14, 2022 | Christian Wolanin | Los Angeles Kings | 1-year | Free agency | |
| March 26, 2023 | Max Sasson | Western Michigan Broncos (NCHC) | 2-year†‡ | Free agency | |
| March 29, 2023 | Akito Hirose | Minnesota State Mavericks (CCHA) | 1-year† | Free agency | |
| March 31, 2023 | Nikita Tolopilo | Södertälje SK (HockeyAllsvenskan) | 2-year†‡ | Free agency | |
| April 4, 2023 | Cole McWard | Ohio State Buckeyes (B1G) | 2-year† | Free agency | |

=== Players lost ===
| Date | Player | New team | Term | Via | Ref |
|---|---|---|---|---|---|
| July 13, 2022 | Madison Bowey | Montreal Canadiens | 1-year | Free agency | |
| July 13, 2022 | Jaroslav Halak | New York Rangers | 1-year | Free agency | |
| July 13, 2022 | Nic Petan | Minnesota Wild | 2-year | Free agency | |
| July 13, 2022 | Sheldon Rempal | Vegas Golden Knights | 2-year | Free agency | |
| July 14, 2022 | Matthew Highmore | St. Louis Blues | 1-year | Free agency | |
| July 15, 2022 | Brad Hunt | Colorado Avalanche | 2-year | Free agency | |
| July 15, 2022 | Ashton Sautner | Winnipeg Jets | 1-year | Free agency | |
| August 4, 2022 | Juho Lammikko | ZSC Lions (NL) | 1-year | Free agency | |
| September 8, 2022 | Justin Bailey | Bakersfield Condors (AHL) | 1-year | Free agency | |
| September 9, 2022 | Devante Stephens | Tucson Roadrunners (AHL) | 1-year | Free agency | |
| May 25, 2023 | Vitali Kravtsov | Traktor Chelyabinsk (KHL) | 2-year‡ | Free agency | |
| June 16, 2023 | Oliver Ekman-Larsson | Florida Panthers | 1-year | Buy-out | |

=== Signings ===
| Date | Player | Term | Ref |
|---|---|---|---|
| July 13, 2022 | Phillip Di Giuseppe | 1-year | |
| July 17, 2022 | Michael DiPietro | 1-year | |
| September 2, 2022 | J. T. Miller | 7-year‡ | |
| January 26, 2023 | Andrei Kuzmenko | 2-year‡ | |
| March 7, 2023 | Guillaume Brisebois | 2-year‡ | |
| March 10, 2023 | Kirill Kudryavtsev | 3-year†‡ | |
| March 12, 2023 | Phillip Di Giuseppe | 2-year‡ | |
| March 13, 2023 | Aidan McDonough | 2-year† | |
| March 23, 2023 | Christian Wolanin | 2-year‡ | |
| April 19, 2023 | Elias Pettersson | 3–year†‡ | |
| May 6, 2023 | Jonathan Lekkerimäki | 3-year†‡ | |
| May 31, 2023 | Jett Woo | 1-year‡ | |

== Draft picks ==
Below are the Vancouver Canucks' selections at the 2022 NHL entry draft, which was held on July 7 and 8, 2022, at Bell Centre in Montreal, Quebec.

| Round | # | Player | Pos | Nationality | College/Junior/Club team (League) |
|---|---|---|---|---|---|
| 1 | 15 | Jonathan Lekkerimaki | RW | Sweden | Djurgårdens IF (SHL) |
| 3 | 80 | Elias Pettersson | D | Sweden | Örebro HK (J20 Nationell) |
| 4 | 112 | Daimon Gardner | C | Canada | Warroad High (USHS-MN) |
| 5 | 144 | Ty Young | G | Canada | Prince George Cougars (WHL) |
| 6 | 176 | Jackson Dorrington | D | United States | Des Moines Buccaneers (USHL) |
| 7 | 208 | Kirill Kudryavtsev | D | Russia | Sault Ste. Marie Greyhounds (OHL) |

Notes:

1. The Vancouver Canucks' second-round pick went to the Minnesota Wild as the result of a trade on March 21, 2022, that sent Jack McBain to Arizona in exchange for this pick.
