= 2022–23 Ottawa Senators season =

Season of play of professional ice hockey team

2022–23 Ottawa Senators
- Division: 6th Atlantic
- Conference: 11th Eastern
- 2022–23 record: 39–35–8
- Home record: 24–14–3
- Road record: 15–21–5
- Goals for: 261
- Goals against: 271

Team information
- General manager: Pierre Dorion
- Coach: D. J. Smith
- Captain: Brady Tkachuk
- Alternate captains: Thomas Chabot; Claude Giroux
- Arena: Canadian Tire Centre
- Average attendance: 16,757
- Minor league affiliates: Belleville Senators (AHL); Allen Americans (ECHL)

Team leaders
- Goals: Tim Stützle (39)
- Assists: Tim Stützle (51)
- Points: Tim Stützle (90)
- Penalty minutes: Brady Tkachuk (126)
- Plus/minus: Erik Brannstrom; Mathieu Joseph (+5)
- Wins: Cam Talbot (17)
- Goals against average: Magnus Hellberg (2.00)

The 2022–23 Ottawa Senators season was the 31st season of the Ottawa Senators of the National Hockey League (NHL). The Senators improved on their record compared to the previous season, but failed to qualify for the playoffs for the sixth consecutive season. The Senators were officially eliminated from the playoffs on April 6, 2023, in the 79th game of the season.

== Team business ==
The National Capital Commission (NCC) resumed the process to redevelop the LeBreton Flats overall site, reserving the site of an arena and asking for preliminary bids on the arena site separately. After a February 2022 deadline to submit bids, the NCC announced that it had received several bids for the site. Local media speculated that the Senators were actively pursuing a bid, authorized by Eugene Melnyk shortly before his death. In June 2022, the NCC accepted the Senators' proposal for a new downtown arena and mixed-use development as part of the Lebreton Flats redevelopment. The team will lease the land for their development. Construction is not expected before 2024 after a leasing agreement is finalized and municipal review of the project is completed. The lease agreement is expected to be put in place by autumn of 2023. In related business, the outstanding lawsuits around the previous LeBreton bid were settled out of court in December 2022.

The team parted ways with their ECHL affiliate, the Atlanta Gladiators, and signed an affiliation agreement with the ECHL's Allen Americans.

On February 17, 2023, the Senators retired Chris Neil's no. 25 jersey.

=== Team sale ===
In November 2022, it was reported that Eugene Melnyk's daughters, and heirs to his estate, had engaged Galatioto Sports Partners, a New York City investment banker, to facilitate a sale of the team. The Senators confirmed the planned sale on November 5, with a condition of sale being that the team remain in Ottawa. On November 7, Canadian actor Ryan Reynolds disclosed publicly that he was interested in being part of the consortium to purchase the team. This was followed by news of bids endorsed by Snoop Dogg and The Weeknd. However, NHL commissioner Gary Bettman stated that the bids for the franchise would "stand on their own merit" and that negotiating in public was discouraged. The group Reynolds aligned with withdrew from bidding before final bids were submitted.

The final deadline to submit binding bids was May 15, 2023. Four groups submitted binding bids. The groups were led by Michael Andlauer, Jeffrey and Michael Kimel, Steve Apostolopoulos and Neko Sparks. Snoop Dogg is associated with the Sparks bid and The Weeknd with the Kimel bid. Andlauer was already a member of the NHL Board of Governors, being a minority owner of the Montreal Canadiens. The Kimels were former minority owners of the Pittsburgh Penguins. Sparks is an entrepreneur focused on emerging technologies based in Los Angeles. Apostolopoulos is a Toronto-based billionaire who had previously attempted to purchase the Washington Commanders of the National Football League. On June 9, Apostolopoulos withdrew his bid from the process. On June 13, 2023, the Senators announced that a purchase agreement had been signed with the group of investors headed by Andlauer. The sale was finalized in September 2023.

== Off-season ==
The Senators began the off-season being very active in trades and personnel changes. On the first day of the entry draft, the team acquired scoring forward Alex DeBrincat from the Chicago Blackhawks, giving up their first-round and second-round picks in 2022 and a third-round pick in 2024. On July 11, 2022, the team traded away goaltender Matt Murray to the Toronto Maple Leafs. The following day, the Senators acquired goaltender Cam Talbot from the Minnesota Wild in exchange for Filip Gustavsson.

The team also bought out forward Colin White and defenceman Michael Del Zotto. The team previously told forwards Chris Tierney, Adam Gaudette, and Tyler Ennis as well as defenceman Victor Mete that they would not be re-signed. Connor Brown was traded to the Washington Capitals for a second-round pick in the 2024 draft.

On the first day of free agency, the team signed free agent forward Claude Giroux. The next day, the team re-signed centre Josh Norris to an eight-year contract extension. The team added veterans Tyler Motte and Derick Brassard to complement the roster.

Former Senators defenceman Wade Redden was hired as a development coach, joining former Senators players Shean Donovan and Jesse Winchester as development coaches.

== Standings ==
=== Divisional standings ===
Atlantic Division
Pos	Team	GP	W	L	OTL	RW	GF	GA	GD	Pts
1	p – Boston Bruins	82	65	12	5	54	305	177	+128	135
2	x – Toronto Maple Leafs	82	50	21	11	42	279	222	+57	111
3	x – Tampa Bay Lightning	82	46	30	6	38	283	254	+29	98
4	x – Florida Panthers	82	42	32	8	36	290	273	+17	92
5	Buffalo Sabres	82	42	33	7	30	296	300	−4	91
6	Ottawa Senators	82	39	35	8	31	261	271	−10	86
7	Detroit Red Wings	82	35	37	10	28	240	279	−39	80
8	Montreal Canadiens	82	31	45	6	21	232	307	−75	68

Source: National Hockey League
Rules for classification: 1) Fewer number of games played (GP, only during regular season); 2) Greater number of regulation wins (RW); 3) Greater number of wins in regulation and overtime, excluding shootout wins (ROW); 4) Greater number of total wins, including shootouts (W); 5) Greater number of points earned in head-to-head play; if teams played an uneven number of head-to-head games, the result of the first game on the home ice of the team with the extra home game is discarded; 6) Greater goal differential (GD); 7) Greater number of goals scored (GF)
p – Clinched Presidents' Trophy; x – Clinched playoff spot

=== Conference standings ===
Eastern Conference Wild Card
Pos	Div	Team	GP	W	L	OTL	RW	GF	GA	GD	Pts
1	ME	x – New York Islanders	82	42	31	9	36	243	222	+21	93
2	AT	x – Florida Panthers	82	42	32	8	36	290	273	+17	92
3	ME	Pittsburgh Penguins	82	40	31	11	31	262	264	−2	91
4	AT	Buffalo Sabres	82	42	33	7	30	296	300	−4	91
5	AT	Ottawa Senators	82	39	35	8	31	261	271	−10	86
6	AT	Detroit Red Wings	82	35	37	10	28	240	279	−39	80
7	ME	Washington Capitals	82	35	37	10	27	255	265	−10	80
8	ME	Philadelphia Flyers	82	31	38	13	26	222	277	−55	75
9	AT	Montreal Canadiens	82	31	45	6	21	232	307	−75	68
10	ME	Columbus Blue Jackets	82	25	48	9	15	214	330	−116	59

Source: National Hockey League
Rules for classification: 1) Fewer number of games played (GP, only during regular season); 2) Greater number of regulation wins (RW); 3) Greater number of wins in regulation and overtime, excluding shootout wins (ROW); 4) Greater number of total wins, including shootouts (W); 5) Greater number of points earned in head-to-head play; if teams played an uneven number of head-to-head games, the result of the first game on the home ice of the team with the extra home game is discarded; 6) Greater goal differential (GD); 7) Greater number of goals scored (GF)
x – Clinched playoff spot

== Schedule and results ==
=== Preseason ===
The pre-season schedule was published on July 1, 2022.

2022 preseason game log: 5–3–0 (home: 3–1–0; road: 2–2–0)
#	Date	Visitor	Score	Home	OT	Decision	Attendance	Record	Recap
1	September 24	Ottawa	1–4	Toronto		Talbot	14,532	0–1–0
2	September 24	Ottawa	4–2	Toronto		Forsberg	14,241	1–1–0
3	September 27	Ottawa	3–5	Winnipeg		Mandolese	13,191	1–2–0
4	September 30	Toronto	6–3	Ottawa		Forsberg	4,307	1–3–0
5	October 1	Montreal	4–5	Ottawa	OT	Sogaard	15,878	2–3–0
6	October 4	Ottawa	5–4	Montreal		Forsberg	19,550	3–3–0
7	October 6	Montreal	3–4	Ottawa		Forsberg	1,100	4–3–0
8	October 8	Montreal	2–3	Ottawa	OT	Hellberg	3,524	5–3–0

=== Regular season ===
The regular season schedule was published on July 6, 2022.

2022–23 game log

October: 4–4–0 (home: 4–1–0; road: 0–3–0)
#	Date	Visitor	Score	Home	OT	Decision	Attendance	Record	Pts	Recap
1	October 13	Ottawa	1–4	Buffalo		Forsberg	15,364	0–1–0	0
2	October 15	Ottawa	2–3	Toronto		Forsberg	18,709	0–2–0	0
3	October 18	Boston	5–7	Ottawa		Forsberg	19,811	1–2–0	2
4	October 20	Washington	2–5	Ottawa		Forsberg	14,210	2–2–0	4
5	October 22	Arizona	2–6	Ottawa		Forsberg	15,107	3–2–0	6
6	October 24	Dallas	2–4	Ottawa		Hellberg	12,088	4–2–0	8
7	October 27	Minnesota	4–2	Ottawa		Forsberg	13,870	4–3–0	8
8	October 29	Ottawa	3–5	Florida		Forsberg	15,577	4–4–0	8

November: 4–9–1 (home: 1–6–0; road: 2–4–1)
#	Date	Visitor	Score	Home	OT	Decision	Attendance	Record	Pts	Recap
9	November 1	Ottawa	3–4	Tampa Bay		Forsberg	19,092	4–5–0	8
10	November 3	Vegas	5–4	Ottawa		Forsberg	16,043	4–6–0	8
11	November 5	Philadelphia	2–1	Ottawa		Talbot	16,722	4–7–0	8
12	November 8	Vancouver	6–4	Ottawa		Talbot	13,351	4–8–0	8
13	November 10	Ottawa	3–4	New Jersey	OT	Forsberg	13,806	4–8–1	9
14	November 12	Ottawa	4–1	Philadelphia		Talbot	16,912	5–8–1	11
15	November 14	NY Islanders	4–2	Ottawa		Talbot	13,408	5–9–1	11
16	November 16	Buffalo	1–4	Ottawa		Forsberg	13,558	6–9–1	13
17	November 19	New Jersey	5–1	Ottawa		Forsberg	18,881	6–10–1	13
18	November 21	Ottawa	1–5	San Jose		Talbot	11,295	6–11–1	13
19	November 23	Ottawa	1–4	Vegas		Talbot	17,955	6–12–1	13
20	November 25	Ottawa	5–1	Anaheim		Talbot	14,278	7–12–1	15
21	November 27	Ottawa	3–2	Los Angeles		Talbot	15,136	8–12–1	17
22	November 30	NY Rangers	3–1	Ottawa		Talbot	14,654	8–13–1	17

December: 8–4–2 (home: 4–1–1; road: 4–3–1)
#	Date	Visitor	Score	Home	OT	Decision	Attendance	Record	Pts	Recap
23	December 2	Ottawa	3–2	NY Rangers	OT	Talbot	18,006	9–13–1	19
24	December 3	San Jose	2–5	Ottawa		Forsberg	17,101	10–13–1	21
25	December 6	Los Angeles	5–2	Ottawa		Talbot	13,459	10–14–1	21
26	December 8	Ottawa	3–4	Dallas	OT	Forsberg	18,023	10–14–2	22
27	December 10	Ottawa	3–2	Nashville		Talbot	17,414	11–14–2	24
28	December 12	Anaheim	0–3	Ottawa		Talbot	14,204	12–14–2	26
29	December 14	Montreal	2–3	Ottawa		Talbot	19,567	13–14–2	28
30	December 17	Ottawa	6–3	Detroit		Talbot	19,515	14–14–2	30
31	December 18	Ottawa	2–4	Minnesota		Forsberg	18,213	14–15–2	30
32	December 20	Ottawa	1–5	Winnipeg		Talbot	14,277	14–16–2	30
33	December 22	Washington	3–2	Ottawa	OT	Talbot	17,231	14–16–3	31
—	December 23	Detroit		Ottawa	Postponed due to winter storm. Moved to February 27.
34	December 27	Boston	2–3	Ottawa	SO	Talbot	20,016	15–16–3	33
35	December 29	Ottawa	4–3	Washington	OT	Talbot	18,573	16–16–3	35
36	December 31	Ottawa	2–4	Detroit		Talbot	19,515	16–17–3	35

January: 8–6–0 (home: 5–3–0; road: 3–3–0)
#	Date	Visitor	Score	Home	OT	Decision	Attendance	Record	Pts	Recap
37	January 1	Buffalo	1–3	Ottawa		Forsberg	18,231	17–17–3	37
38	January 3	Columbus	0–4	Ottawa		Forsberg	14,457	18–17–3	39
39	January 7	Seattle	8–4	Ottawa		Talbot	19,347	18–18–3	39
40	January 9	Nashville	3–0	Ottawa		Talbot	13,362	18–19–3	39
41	January 12	Ottawa	5–3	Arizona		Forsberg	4,600	19–19–3	41
42	January 14	Ottawa	0–7	Colorado		Forsberg	18,124	19–20–3	41
43	January 16	Ottawa	1–2	St. Louis		Talbot	18,096	19–21–3	41
44	January 18	Pittsburgh	4–5	Ottawa	OT	Talbot	17,106	20–21–3	43
45	January 20	Ottawa	1–4	Pittsburgh		Talbot	18,237	20–22–3	43
46	January 21	Winnipeg	5–1	Ottawa		Forsberg	19,042	20–23–3	43
47	January 25	NY Islanders	1–2	Ottawa		Talbot	13,980	21–23–3	45
48	January 27	Ottawa	6–2	Toronto		Forsberg	18,727	22–23–3	47
49	January 28	Montreal	0–5	Ottawa		Forsberg	20,034	23–23–3	49
50	January 31	Ottawa	5–4	Montreal		Forsberg	21,105	24–23–3	51

February: 6–3–1 (home: 4–1–1; road: 2–2–0)
#	Date	Visitor	Score	Home	OT	Decision	Attendance	Record	Pts	Recap
51	February 11	Edmonton	6–3	Ottawa		Forsberg	20,041	24–24–3	51
52	February 13	Calgary	3–4	Ottawa	OT	Sogaard	15,024	25–24–3	53
53	February 14	Ottawa	3–2	NY Islanders	SO	Mandolese	15,134	26–24–3	55
54	February 17	Chicago	4–3	Ottawa	OT	Sogaard	19,125	26–24–4	56
55	February 19	St. Louis	2–7	Ottawa		Sogaard	18,871	27–24–4	58
56	February 20	Ottawa	1–3	Boston		Mandolese	17,850	27–25–4	58
57	February 24	Ottawa	0–4	Carolina		Talbot	18,788	27–26–4	58
58	February 25	Ottawa	5–2	Montreal		Sogaard	21,105	28–26–4	60
59	February 27	Detroit	2–6	Ottawa		Talbot	16,214	29–26–4	62
60	February 28	Detroit	1–6	Ottawa		Sogaard	14,071	30–26–4	64

March: 7–7–1 (home: 4–1–1; road: 3–6–0)
#	Date	Visitor	Score	Home	OT	Decision	Attendance	Record	Pts	Recap
61	March 2	Ottawa	5–3	NY Rangers		Talbot	18,006	31–26–4	66
62	March 4	Columbus	2–5	Ottawa		Talbot	18,073	32–26–4	68
63	March 6	Ottawa	0–5	Chicago		Sogaard	15,049	32–27–4	68
64	March 9	Ottawa	5–4	Seattle		Sogaard	17,151	33–27–4	70
65	March 11	Ottawa	2–5	Vancouver		Sogaard	18,813	33–28–4	70
66	March 12	Ottawa	1–5	Calgary		Mandolese	17,031	33–29–4	70
67	March 14	Ottawa	3–6	Edmonton		Sogaard	18,347	33–30–4	70
68	March 16	Colorado	5–4	Ottawa		Sogaard	19,158	33–31–4	70
69	March 18	Toronto	5–4	Ottawa	SO	Sogaard	20,092	33–31–5	71
70	March 20	Ottawa	2–1	Pittsburgh		Ferguson	17,080	34–31–5	73
71	March 21	Ottawa	1–2	Boston		Sogaard	17,850	34–32–5	73
72	March 23	Tampa Bay	2–7	Ottawa		Sogaard	16,133	35–32–5	75
73	March 25	Ottawa	3–5	New Jersey		Ferguson	16,514	35–33–5	75
74	March 27	Florida	2–5	Ottawa		Sogaard	16,047	36–33–5	77
75	March 30	Philadelphia	4–5	Ottawa	OT	Talbot	17,518	37–33–5	79

April: 2–2–3 (home: 2–1–0; road: 0–1–3)
#	Date	Visitor	Score	Home	OT	Decision	Attendance	Record	Pts	Recap
76	April 1	Toronto	3–0	Ottawa		Sogaard	20,097	37–34–5	79
77	April 2	Ottawa	3–4	Columbus	OT	Talbot	18,872	37–34–6	80
78	April 4	Ottawa	2–3	Carolina	OT	Merilainen	18,680	37–34–7	81
79	April 6	Ottawa	2–7	Florida		Merilainen	16,675	37–35–7	81
80	April 8	Tampa Bay	4–7	Ottawa		Talbot	19,044	38–35–7	83
81	April 10	Carolina	2–3	Ottawa		Sogaard	18,688	39–35–7	85
82	April 13	Ottawa	3–4	Buffalo	OT	Sogaard	16,739	39–35–8	86

Legend: Win (2 points) Loss (0 points) Overtime/shootout loss (1 point)

== Player statistics ==
Final Statistics

=== Skaters ===
Regular season
Player	GP	G	A	Pts	+/−	PIM
Tim Stützle	78	39	51	90	−3	54
Brady Tkachuk	82	35	48	83	−10	126
Claude Giroux	82	35	44	79	+4	34
Alex DeBrincat	82	27	39	66	−31	45
Drake Batherson	82	22	40	62	−35	33
Thomas Chabot	68	11	30	41	−11	52
Shane Pinto	82	20	15	35	−21	18
Jake Sanderson	77	4	28	32	−6	12
Derick Brassard	62	13	10	23	+3	30
Travis Hamonic	75	6	15	21	−5	71
Mathieu Joseph	56	3	15	18	+5	36
Erik Brannstrom	74	2	16	18	+5	38
Nick Holden	65	2	14	16	0	10
Austin Watson	75	9	2	11	−7	123
Mark Kastelic	65	7	4	11	−6	102
Dylan Gambrell	60	4	6	10	−4	35
Artyom Zub	53	3	7	10	+2	39
Tyler Motte^{‡}	38	3	6	9	+1	4
Ridly Greig	20	2	7	9	+1	12
Julien Gauthier^{†}	17	3	2	5	−1	2
Jakob Chychrun^{†}	12	2	3	5	−1	8
Patrick Brown^{†}	18	2	3	5	+4	27
Nikita Zaitsev^{‡}	28	0	5	5	−5	8
Parker Kelly	55	1	3	4	−9	37
Josh Norris	8	2	1	3	−1	6
Egor Sokolov	5	1	1	2	+2	0
Tyler Kleven	8	0	2	2	−1	2
Jake Lucchini	11	1	0	1	−2	0
Jacob Bernard-Docker	19	0	1	1	−2	11
Lassi Thomson	2	0	0	0	−2	4
Jacob Larsson	7	0	0	0	0	6
Rourke Chartier	6	0	0	0	0	0
Dillon Heatherington	3	0	0	0	−3	0
Maxence Guenette	1	0	0	0	−1	0

=== Goaltenders ===
Regular season
Player	GP	GS	TOI	W	L	OT	GA	GAA	SA	SV%	SO	G	A	PIM
Cam Talbot	36	32	1,947:00	17	14	2	95	2.93	935	.898	1	0	0	0
Anton Forsberg	28	25	1,471:43	11	11	2	80	3.26	817	.902	2	0	0	2
Mads Sogaard	19	17	1,047:30	8	6	3	58	3.32	524	.889	0	0	1	0
Dylan Ferguson	2	2	118:52	1	1	0	5	2.52	83	.940	0	0	0	0
Magnus Hellberg^{‡}	1	1	60:00	1	0	0	2	2.00	31	.935	0	0	0	0
Kevin Mandolese	3	3	182:12	1	2	0	10	3.29	119	.916	0	0	0	0
Leevi Merilainen	2	2	85:05	0	1	1	6	4.23	49	.878	0	0	0	0

^{†}Denotes player spent time with another team before joining the Senators. Stats reflect time with the Senators only.
^{‡}No longer with the Senators.

== Awards and milestones ==
=== Awards ===
Player	Award	Ref.
Shane Pinto	October NHL Rookie of the Month	
Claude Giroux	NHL Stars of The Week (1st)	
Mads Sogaard	February NHL Rookie of the Month	
Jake Sanderson	2022–23 NHL All-Rookie Team	

=== Milestones ===
Player	Milestone	Date	Ref.
Jake Sanderson	1st career NHL game	October 13, 2022	
Claude Giroux	300th career NHL goal	November 5, 2022	
Jake Sanderson	1st career NHL goal	November 24, 2022	
Jake Lucchini	1st career NHL game	December 14, 2022	
Jake Lucchini	1st career NHL goal	January 2, 2023	
Jake Lucchini	1st career NHL point	January 2, 2023	
Ridly Greig	1st career NHL game	January 25, 2023	
Ridly Greig	1st career NHL point	January 25, 2023	
Kevin Mandolese	1st career NHL game	February 14, 2023	
Kevin Mandolese	1st career NHL win	February 14, 2023	
Ridly Greig	1st career NHL goal	February 19, 2023	
Derick Brassard	1,000th career NHL game	March 2, 2023	
Dylan Ferguson	1st career NHL win	March 20, 2023	
Tyler Kleven	1st career NHL game	March 30, 2023	
Tyler Kleven	1st career NHL point	March 30, 2023	
Leevi Merilainen	1st career NHL game	April 4, 2023	
Egor Sokolov	1st career NHL goal	April 8, 2023	
Claude Giroux	1,000th career NHL point	April 10, 2023	
Maxence Guenette	1st career NHL game	April 13, 2023	

== Transactions ==
The Senators have been involved in the following transactions during the 2022–23 season.

=== Trades ===
Date	Details		Ref
July 7, 2022	To Chicago Blackhawks 1st-round pick in 2022; 2nd-round pick in 2022; 3rd-round pick in 2024	To Ottawa Senators Alex DeBrincat	
July 12, 2022	To Toronto Maple Leafs Matt Murray; 3rd-round pick in 2023; 7th-round pick in 2024	To Ottawa Senators Future considerations	
July 12, 2022	To Minnesota Wild Filip Gustavsson	To Ottawa Senators Cam Talbot	
July 13, 2022	To Washington Capitals Connor Brown	To Ottawa Senators 2nd-round pick in 2024	
February 19, 2023	To New York Rangers Tyler Motte	To Ottawa Senators Julien Gauthier; 7th-round pick in 2023	TSN
February 22, 2023	To Chicago Blackhawks Nikita Zaitsev; 2nd-round pick in 2023; 4th-round pick in 2026	To Ottawa Senators Future considerations	ESPN
March 1, 2023	To Arizona Coyotes Conditional 1st-round pick in 2023; Conditional 2nd-round pick in 2024; 2nd-round pick in 2025	To Ottawa Senators Jakob Chychrun	TSN
March 3, 2023	To Philadelphia Flyers 6th-round pick in 2023	To Ottawa Senators Patrick Brown	Sportsnet
March 10, 2023	To Calgary Flames Kristians Rubins	To Ottawa Senators Future considerations	NHL
March 10, 2023	To New Jersey Devils Jayce Hawryluk	To Ottawa Senators Future considerations	Sportsnet

=== Players acquired ===
Date	Player	Former team	Term	Via	Ref
July 13, 2022	Claude Giroux	Florida Panthers	3-year	Free agency	
July 13, 2022	Jake Lucchini	Belleville Senators (AHL)	1-year	Free agency	
July 13, 2022	Kristians Rubins	Toronto Maple Leafs	1-year	Free agency	
July 14, 2022	Antoine Bibeau	Seattle Kraken	1-year	Free agency	
July 14, 2022	Jacob Larsson	Anaheim Ducks	1-year	Free agency	
July 18, 2022	Rourke Chartier	Belleville Senators (AHL)	1-year	Free agency	
July 25, 2022	Jayce Hawryluk	Skellefteå AIK (SHL)	1-year	Free agency	
September 14, 2022	Tyler Motte	New York Rangers	1-year	Free agency	
October 3, 2022	Magnus Hellberg	Seattle Kraken		Waivers	
October 10, 2022	Derick Brassard	Edmonton Oilers	1-year	Free agency	
May 5, 2023	Jiri Smejkal	IK Oskarshamn (SHL)	1-year†‡	Free agency	
May 25, 2023	Nikolas Matinpalo	Porin Assat (Liiga)	1-year†‡	Free agency	

=== Players lost ===
Date	Player	New team	Term	Via	Ref
July 12, 2022	Michael Del Zotto			Buy-out	
July 13, 2022	Andrew Agozzino	San Jose Sharks	2-year	Free agency	
July 13, 2022	Clark Bishop	Calgary Flames	1-year	Free agency	
July 13, 2022	Adam Gaudette	Toronto Maple Leafs	1-year	Free agency	
July 13, 2022	Logan Shaw	Toronto Marlies (AHL)	3 year	Free agency	
July 13, 2022	Colin White	Florida Panthers	1-year	Free agency	
July 14, 2022	Victor Mete	Toronto Maple Leafs	1-year	Free agency	
July 17, 2022	Michael Del Zotto	Florida Panthers	1-year	Free agency	
July 19, 2022	Chris Tierney	Florida Panthers	1-year	Free agency	
October 3, 2022	Zachary Senyshyn	Utica Comets (AHL)	1-year	Free agency	
October 10, 2022	Michael McNiven	Greenville Swamp Rabbits (ECHL)	1-year	Free agency	
November 10, 2022	Magnus Hellberg	Seattle Kraken		Waivers	
May 6, 2023	Viktor Lodin	IK Oskarshamn (SHL)	2-year‡	Free agency	

=== Player signings ===
Date	Player	Term	Ref
July 7, 2022	Dillon Heatherington	2-year	NHL
July 13, 2022	Scott Sabourin	1-year	Sportsnet
July 14, 2022	Josh Norris	8-year	NHL
July 15, 2022	Tomas Hamara	3-year†	NHL
July 28, 2022	Mathieu Joseph	4-year	NHL
September 5, 2022	Erik Brannstrom	1-year	NHL
September 7, 2022	Tim Stützle	8-year‡	NHL
September 23, 2022	Jorian Donovan	3-year†	NHL
October 10, 2022	Derick Brassard	1-year	Sportsnet
October 27, 2022	Mark Kastelic	2-year‡	NHL
December 21, 2022	Artyom Zub	4-year‡	NHL
March 23, 2023	Tyler Kleven	3-year†	NHL
June 15, 2023	Oskar Pettersson	3-year†	NHL
June 29, 2023	Jacob Larsson	1-year	Sportsnet

==== Key ====
† Contract is entry-level.
‡ Contract initially takes effect in the 2023–24 season.

== Draft picks ==
The 2022 NHL Entry Draft was held July 7–8, 2022 at the Bell Centre arena in Montreal, Quebec, Canada. The Senators traded their first-round pick and second-round pick to acquire Alex DeBrincat. The Senators' first pick was made in the second round - defenceman Filip Nordberg with the 64th-overall pick. The team had nine selections overall.

Round	Overall	Player	Position	Nationality	Club team
2	64	Filip Nordberg	D	Sweden	Sodertalje SK (HockeyAllsvenskan)
3	72	Oskar Pettersson	RW	Sweden	Rogle J20 (J20 Nationell)
3	87	Tomas Hamara	D	Czech Republic	Tappara U20 (U20 SM-sarja)
4	107	Stephen Halliday	C	Canada	Dubuque Fighting Saints (USHL)
5	136	Jorian Donovan	D	Canada	Hamilton Bulldogs (OHL)
5	143	Cameron O'Neill	RW	USA	Mount St. Charles Academy (NEPACK 18U)
5	151	Kevin Reidler	G	Sweden	AIK J18 (J20 Nationell)
6	168	Theo Wallberg	D	Sweden	Skelleftea AIK J20 (J20 Nationell)
7	206	Tyson Dyck	C	Canada	Cranbrook Bucks (BCHL)
