= 2022–23 Chicago Blackhawks season =

National Hockey League season

2022–23 Chicago Blackhawks
- Division: 8th Central
- Conference: 15th Western
- 2022–23 record: 26–49–7
- Home record: 14–23–4
- Road record: 12–26–3
- Goals for: 204
- Goals against: 301

Team information
- General manager: Kyle Davidson
- Coach: Luke Richardson
- Captain: Jonathan Toews
- Alternate captains: Seth Jones; Patrick Kane (Oct. 12 – Feb. 28); Connor Murphy
- Arena: United Center
- Average attendance: 17,167
- Minor league affiliates: Rockford IceHogs (AHL); Indy Fuel (ECHL)

Team leaders
- Goals: Andreas Athanasiou; Taylor Raddysh (20)
- Assists: Max Domi (31)
- Points: Max Domi (49)
- Penalty minutes: Max Domi (76)
- Plus/minus: Jake McCabe (+7)
- Wins: Petr Mrazek (10)
- Goals against average: Jaxson Stauber (2.81)

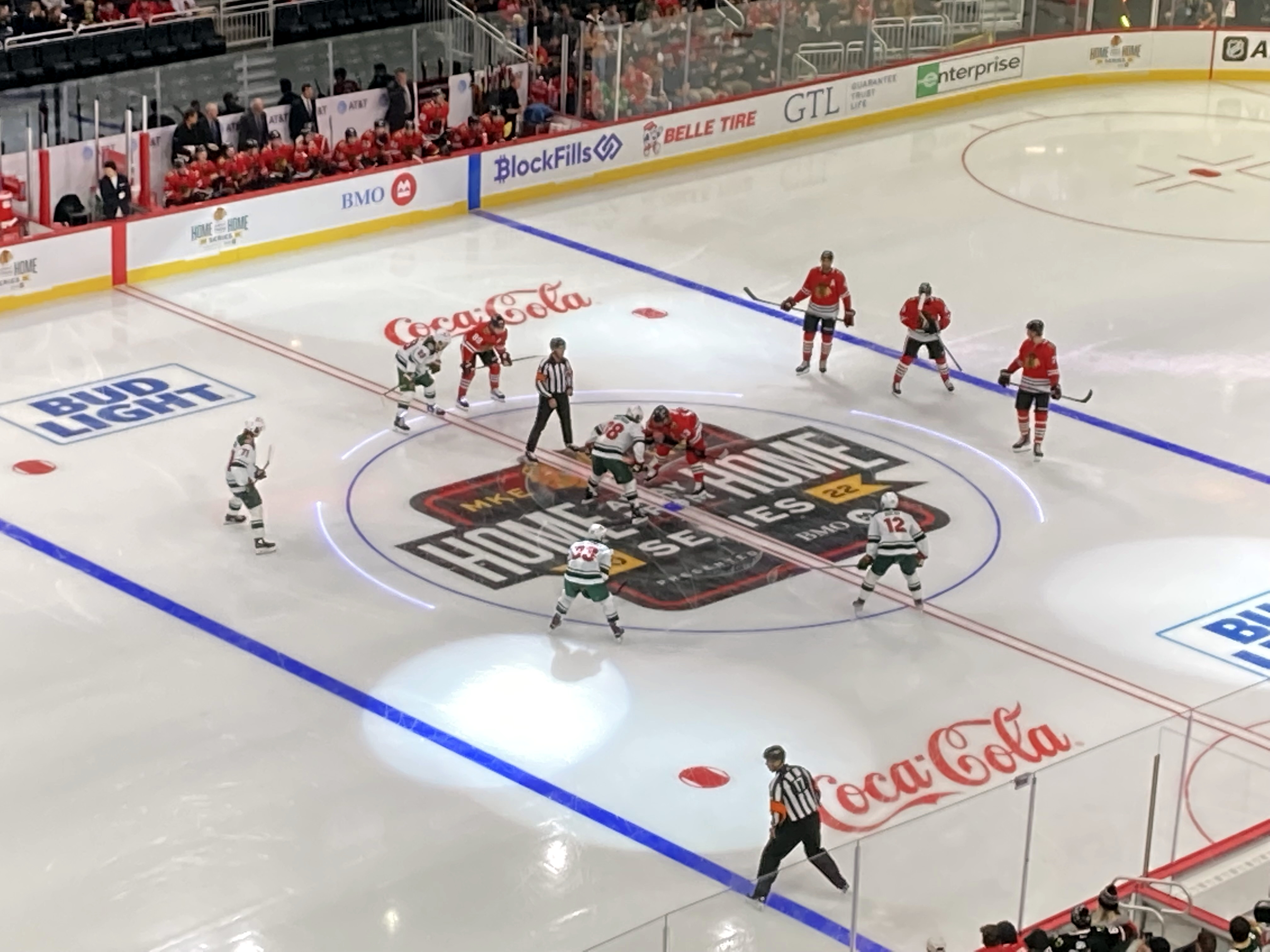
Minnesota Wild vs. Chicago Blackhawks preseason game in Milwaukee

The 2022–23 Chicago Blackhawks season was the 97th season for the National Hockey League (NHL) franchise that was established on September 25, 1926. The Blackhawks were led by first-year head coach Luke Richardson.

On March 18, 2023, the Blackhawks were eliminated from playoff contention after a loss to the Arizona Coyotes.

== Standings ==
=== Divisional standings ===
Central Division
Pos	Team	GP	W	L	OTL	RW	GF	GA	GD	Pts
1	y – Colorado Avalanche	82	51	24	7	36	280	226	+54	109
2	x – Dallas Stars	82	47	21	14	39	285	218	+67	108
3	x – Minnesota Wild	82	46	25	11	34	246	225	+21	103
4	x – Winnipeg Jets	82	46	33	3	36	247	225	+22	95
5	Nashville Predators	82	42	32	8	29	229	238	−9	92
6	St. Louis Blues	82	37	38	7	27	263	301	−38	81
7	Arizona Coyotes	82	28	40	14	20	228	299	−71	70
8	Chicago Blackhawks	82	26	49	7	18	204	301	−97	59

Source: National Hockey League
Rules for classification: 1) Fewer number of games played (GP, only during regular season); 2) Greater number of regulation wins (RW); 3) Greater number of wins in regulation and overtime, excluding shootout wins (ROW); 4) Greater number of total wins, including shootouts (W); 5) Greater number of points earned in head-to-head play; if teams played an uneven number of head-to-head games, the result of the first game on the home ice of the team with the extra home game is discarded; 6) Greater goal differential (GD); 7) Greater number of goals scored (GF)
x – Clinched playoff spot; y – Clinched division

=== Conference standings ===
Western Conference Wild Card
Pos	Div	Team	GP	W	L	OTL	RW	GF	GA	GD	Pts
1	PA	x – Seattle Kraken	82	46	28	8	37	289	256	+33	100
2	CE	x – Winnipeg Jets	82	46	33	3	36	247	225	+22	95
3	PA	Calgary Flames	82	38	27	17	31	260	252	+8	93
4	CE	Nashville Predators	82	42	32	8	29	229	238	−9	92
5	PA	Vancouver Canucks	82	38	37	7	24	276	298	−22	83
6	CE	St. Louis Blues	82	37	38	7	27	263	301	−38	81
7	CE	Arizona Coyotes	82	28	40	14	20	228	299	−71	70
8	PA	San Jose Sharks	82	22	44	16	16	234	321	−87	60
9	CE	Chicago Blackhawks	82	26	49	7	18	204	301	−97	59
10	PA	Anaheim Ducks	82	23	47	12	13	209	338	−129	58

Source: National Hockey League
Rules for classification: 1) Fewer number of games played (GP, only during regular season); 2) Greater number of regulation wins (RW); 3) Greater number of wins in regulation and overtime, excluding shootout wins (ROW); 4) Greater number of total wins, including shootouts (W); 5) Greater number of points earned in head-to-head play; if teams played an uneven number of head-to-head games, the result of the first game on the home ice of the team with the extra home game is discarded; 6) Greater goal differential (GD); 7) Greater number of goals scored (GF)
x – Clinched playoff spot

== Schedule and results ==
=== Preseason ===
The preseason schedule was published on August 3, 2022.

2022 preseason game log: 1–5–0 (home: 0–3–0; road: 1–2–0)
#	Date	Opponent	Score	OT	Decision	Arena	Attendance	Record	Recap
1	September 27	St. Louis	1–4		Mrazek	United Center	10,317	0–1–0
2	September 28	@ Detroit	4–2		Soderblom	Little Caesars Arena	12,782	1–1–0
3	October 1	Detroit	0–3		Stalock	United Center	15,735	1–2–0
4	October 2	Minnesota	0–3		Mrazek	Fiserv Forum	15,178	1–3–0
5	October 6	@ Minnesota	1–4		Stalock	Xcel Energy Center	14,003	1–4–0
6	October 8	@ St. Louis	0–6		Mrazek	Enterprise Center	18,096	1–5–0

=== Regular season ===
The regular season schedule was published on July 6, 2022.

2022–23 game log

October: 4–3–2 (home: 2–1–1; road: 1–2–1)
#	Date	Opponent	Score	OT	Decision	Attendance	Record	Pts	Recap
1	October 12	@ Colorado	2–5		Mrazek	18,143	0–1–0	0
2	October 13	@ Vegas	0–1		Stalock	18,467	0–2–0	0
3	October 15	@ San Jose	5–2		Mrazek	15,219	1–2–0	2
4	October 21	Detroit	4–3	OT	Stalock	18,753	2–2–0	4
5	October 23	Seattle	5–4		Stalock	14,892	3–2–0	6
6	October 25	Florida	4–2		Stalock	12,859	4–2–0	8
7	October 27	Edmonton	5–6		Stalock	13,685	4–3–0	8
8	October 29	@ Buffalo	3–4	OT	Soderblom	14,547	4–3–1	9
9	October 30	Minnesota	3–4	SO	Stalock	14,149	4–3–2	10

November: 2–9–2 (home: 1–6–1; road: 1–3–1)
#	Date	Opponent	Score	OT	Decision	Attendance	Record	Pts	Recap
10	November 1	NY Islanders	1–3		Soderblom	12,523	4–4–2	10
11	November 3	Los Angeles	2–1	OT	Soderblom	16,658	5–4–2	12
12	November 5	@ Winnipeg	0–4		Soderblom	13,210	5–5–2	12
13	November 10	@ Los Angeles	1–2	OT	Mrazek	16,443	5–5–3	13
14	November 12	@ Anaheim	3–2		Soderblom	15,184	6–5–3	15
15	November 14	Carolina	0–3		Mrazek	15,676	6–6–3	15
16	November 16	St. Louis	2–5		Soderblom	16,284	6–7–3	15
17	November 19	@ Boston	1–6		Mrazek	17,850	6–8–3	15
18	November 20	Pittsburgh	3–5		Soderblom	21,182	6–9–3	15
19	November 23	@ Dallas	4–6		Mrazek	18,532	6–10–3	15
20	November 25	Montreal	2–3	SO	Soderblom	16,159	6–10–4	16
21	November 27	Winnipeg	2–7		Mrazek	17,611	6–11–4	16
22	November 30	Edmonton	4–5		Soderblom	15,397	6–12–4	16

December: 2–11–0 (home: 1–5–0; road: 1–6–0)
#	Date	Opponent	Score	OT	Decision	Attendance	Record	Pts	Recap
23	December 3	@ NY Rangers	5–2		Mrazek	18,006	7–12–4	18
24	December 4	@ NY Islanders	0–3		Soderblom	16,124	7–13–4	18
25	December 6	@ New Jersey	0–3		Soderblom	13,071	7–14–4	18
26	December 9	Winnipeg	1–3		Soderblom	17,847	7–15–4	18
27	December 13	Washington	3–7		Mrazek	16,181	7–16–4	18
28	December 15	Vegas	1–4		Soderblom	15,911	7–17–4	18
29	December 16	@ Minnesota	1–4		Mrazek	18,501	7–18–4	18
30	December 18	NY Rangers	1–7		Soderblom	17,365	7–19–4	18
31	December 21	Nashville	2–4		Mrazek	15,239	7–20–4	18
32	December 23	Columbus	5–2		Stalock	17,108	8–20–4	20
33	December 27	@ Carolina	0–3		Mrazek	18,814	8–21–4	20
34	December 29	@ St. Louis	1–3		Stalock	18,096	8–22–4	20
35	December 31	@ Columbus	1–4		Stalock	18,280	8–23–4	20

January: 7–6–0 (home: 4–4–0; road: 3–2–0)
#	Date	Opponent	Score	OT	Decision	Attendance	Record	Pts	Recap
36	January 1	San Jose	2–5		Mrazek	19,047	8–24–4	20
37	January 3	Tampa Bay	1–4		Stalock	18,429	8–25–4	20
38	January 6	Arizona	2–0		Stalock	19,359	9–25–4	22
39	January 8	Calgary	4–3	OT	Stalock	18,123	10–25–4	24
40	January 12	Colorado	3–2		Mrazek	16,532	11–25–4	26
41	January 14	Seattle	5–8		Stalock	20,075	11–26–4	26
42	January 17	Buffalo	4–3	OT	Mrazek	16,363	12–26–4	28
43	January 19	@ Philadelphia	4–1		Mrazek	16,460	13–26–4	30
44	January 21	@ St. Louis	5–3		Stauber	18,096	14–26–4	32
45	January 22	Los Angeles	1–2		Mrazek	19,236	14–27–4	32
46	January 24	@ Vancouver	2–5		Mrazek	18,988	14–28–4	32
47	January 26	@ Calgary	5–1		Stauber	17,659	15–28–4	34
48	January 28	@ Edmonton	3–7		Mrazek	18,347	15–29–4	34

February: 6–5–1 (home: 3–0–1; road: 3–5–0)
#	Date	Opponent	Score	OT	Decision	Attendance	Record	Pts	Recap
49	February 7	Anaheim	2–3	OT	Mrazek	18,292	15–29–5	35
50	February 10	Arizona	4–3	OT	Stauber	19,007	16–29–5	37
51	February 11	@ Winnipeg	1–4		Mrazek	14,440	16–30–5	37
52	February 14	@ Montreal	0–4		Stauber	21,105	16–31–5	37
53	February 15	@ Toronto	2–5		Mrazek	18,882	16–32–5	37
54	February 17	@ Ottawa	4–3	OT	Mrazek	19,125	17–32–5	39
55	February 19	Toronto	5–3		Stauber	20,979	18–32–5	41
56	February 21	Vegas	3–2	SO	Mrazek	18,083	19–32–5	43
57	February 22	@ Dallas	4–3		Stauber	18,326	20–32–5	45
58	February 25	@ San Jose	4–3	SO	Mrazek	17,562	21–32–5	47
59	February 27	@ Anaheim	2–4		Mrazek	14,462	21–33–5	47
60	February 28	@ Arizona	1–4		Stalock	4,600	21–34–5	47

March: 3–11–1 (home: 2–5–0; road: 1–6–1)
#	Date	Opponent	Score	OT	Decision	Attendance	Record	Pts	Recap
61	March 2	Dallas	2–5		Mrazek	17,612	21–35–5	47
62	March 4	Nashville	1–3		Mrazek	18,942	21–36–5	47
63	March 6	Ottawa	5–0		Stalock	15,049	22–36–5	49
64	March 8	@ Detroit	3–4		Stalock	19,181	22–37–5	49
65	March 10	@ Florida	3–4	OT	Mrazek	17,468	22–37–6	50
66	March 11	@ Tampa Bay	1–3		Mrazek	19,092	22–38–6	50
67	March 14	Boston	6–3		Stalock	20,188	23–38–6	52
68	March 16	@ Nashville	2–1		Stalock	17,538	24–38–6	54
69	March 18	@ Arizona	2–4		Stalock	4,600	24–39–6	54
70	March 20	@ Colorado	0–5		Stalock	18,121	24–40–6	54
71	March 23	@ Washington	1–6		Khudobin	18,573	24–41–6	54
72	March 25	@ Minnesota	1–3		Stalock	19,312	24–42–6	54
73	March 26	Vancouver	2–4		Mrazek	18,276	24–43–6	54
74	March 28	Dallas	1–4		Stalock	14,060	24–44–6	54
75	March 30	St. Louis	3–5		Mrazek	16,465	24–45–6	54

April: 2–4–1 (home: 0–2–1; road: 2–2–0)
#	Date	Opponent	Score	OT	Decision	Attendance	Record	Pts	Recap
76	April 1	New Jersey	3–6		Stalock	18,778	24–46–6	54
77	April 4	@ Calgary	4–3		Mrazek	17,137	25–46–6	56
78	April 6	@ Vancouver	0–3		Stalock	18,945	25–47–6	56
79	April 8	@ Seattle	3–7		Mrazek	17,151	25–48–6	56
80	April 10	Minnesota	2–4		Stalock	15,268	25–49–6	56
81	April 11	@ Pittsburgh	5–2		Mrazek	18,435	26–49–6	58
82	April 13	Philadelphia	4–5	OT	Stalock	20,219	26–49–7	59

Legend: Win (2 points) Loss (0 points) Overtime/shootout loss (1 point)

== Player statistics ==
=== Skaters ===
Regular season
Player	GP	G	A	Pts	+/−	PIM
Max Domi^{‡}	60	18	31	49	−9	76
Patrick Kane^{‡}	54	16	29	45	−23	10
Andreas Athanasiou	81	20	20	40	−29	34
Taylor Raddysh	78	20	17	37	−28	16
Seth Jones	72	12	25	37	−38	30
Tyler Johnson	56	12	20	32	−21	16
Jonathan Toews	53	15	16	31	−31	43
Jason Dickinson	78	9	21	30	−29	28
Philipp Kurashev	70	9	16	25	−32	14
Sam Lafferty^{‡}	51	10	11	21	−10	28
Jake McCabe^{‡}	55	2	18	20	+7	27
Boris Katchouk	58	5	11	16	−10	27
Caleb Jones	73	4	12	16	−19	40
Lukas Reichel	23	7	8	15	−8	6
Jujhar Khaira	51	6	8	14	−11	31
Connor Murphy	80	7	6	13	−10	69
MacKenzie Entwistle	66	4	6	10	−11	14
Colin Blackwell	53	2	8	10	−16	6
Anders Bjork^{†}	13	2	6	8	+4	2
Jarred Tinordi	44	2	6	8	−17	40
Ian Mitchell	35	1	7	8	−8	8
Cole Guttman	14	4	2	6	+1	2
Joey Anderson^{†}	24	4	2	6	−9	0
Reese Johnson	57	4	2	6	−15	38
Isaak Phillips	16	1	4	5	−10	5
Jack Johnson^{‡}	58	0	4	4	−25	16
Buddy Robinson	9	1	2	3	+1	4
Filip Roos	17	1	2	3	−5	4
Nikita Zaitsev^{†}	18	1	2	3	−4	12
Wyatt Kaiser	9	0	3	3	−4	4
Austin Wagner	7	1	1	2	−2	0
Dave Gust	4	1	0	1	−2	2
Brett Seney	7	1	0	1	−2	2
Alex Vlasic	6	0	1	1	−1	0
Luke Philp	3	0	1	1	0	2
Andreas Englund^{†}	11	0	1	1	−2	9
Mike Hardman	8	0	0	0	−2	0
Alec Regula	4	0	0	0	−3	4

=== Goaltenders ===
Regular season
Player	GP	GS	TOI	W	L	OT	GA	GAA	SA	SV%	SO	G	A	PIM
Petr Mrazek	39	38	2,165:10	10	22	3	132	3.66	1,248	.894	0	0	2	4
Alex Stalock	27	24	1,475:20	9	15	2	74	3.01	804	.908	2	0	0	16
Jaxson Stauber	6	6	363:30	5	1	0	17	2.81	191	.911	0	0	0	0
Arvid Soderblom	15	13	835:14	2	10	2	48	3.45	453	.894	0	0	0	0
Dylan Wells^{‡}	1	0	20:00	0	0	0	1	3.00	13	.923	0	0	0	0
Anton Khudobin	1	1	60:00	0	1	0	6	6.00	28	.786	0	0	0	0

^{†}Denotes player spent time with another team before joining the Blackhawks. Stats reflect time with the Blackhawks only.
^{‡}Denotes player was traded mid-season. Stats reflect time with the Blackhawks only.
Bold/italics denotes franchise record.

== Transactions ==
The Blackhawks have been involved in the following transactions during the 2022–23 season.

Key:

† Contract is entry-level.
‡ Contract initially takes effect in the 2023-24 season.

=== Trades ===
Date	Details		Ref
July 7, 2022	To Montreal Canadiens Kirby Dach	To Chicago Blackhawks NYI 1st-round pick in 2022; 3rd-round pick in 2022	
July 7, 2022	To Ottawa Senators Alex DeBrincat	To Chicago Blackhawks 1st-round pick in 2022; 2nd-round pick in 2022	
July 7, 2022	To Toronto Maple Leafs 2nd-round pick in 2022	To Chicago Blackhawks Petr Mrazek; 1st-round pick in 2022	
July 8, 2022	To Arizona Coyotes EDM 3rd-round pick in 2022	To Chicago Blackhawks 3rd-round pick in 2023	
July 8, 2022	To Carolina Hurricanes 6th-round pick in 2023	To Chicago Blackhawks 6th-round pick in 2022	
July 8, 2022	To Pittsburgh Penguins 6th-round pick in 2022	To Chicago Blackhawks Liam Gorman	
October 7, 2022	To Vancouver Canucks Riley Stillman	To Chicago Blackhawks Jason Dickinson; 2nd-round pick in 2024	
October 26, 2022	To Montreal Canadiens Nicolas Beaudin	To Chicago Blackhawks Cam Hillis	
October 26, 2022	To Philadelphia Flyers Evan Barratt	To Chicago Blackhawks Cooper Zech	
February 22, 2023	To Ottawa Senators Future considerations	To Chicago Blackhawks Nikita Zaitsev; 2nd-round pick in 2023; 4th-round pick in 2026	
February 23, 2023	To Anaheim Ducks Josiah Slavin	To Chicago Blackhawks Hunter Drew	
February 26, 2023	To Colorado Avalanche Jack Johnson	To Chicago Blackhawks Andreas Englund	
February 27, 2023	To Toronto Maple Leafs Sam Lafferty; Jake McCabe*; Conditional 5th-round pick in 2024; Conditional 5th-round in 2025	To Chicago Blackhawks Joey Anderson; Pavel Gogolev; Conditional 1st-round pick in 2025; 2nd-round pick in 2026	
February 28, 2023	To Arizona Coyotes Conditional 3rd-round pick in 2025	To Chicago Blackhawks Vili Saarijarvi; Andy Welinski conditional 2nd-round pick in 2023 or 1st-round pick in 2024 or 1st-round pick in 2025; 4th-round pick in 2025	
February 28, 2023	To New York Rangers Patrick Kane*; Cooper Zech	To Chicago Blackhawks Vili Saarijarvi; Andy Welinski conditional 2nd-round pick in 2023 or 1st-round pick in 2024 or 1st-round pick in 2025; 4th-round pick in 2025	
March 2, 2023	To Anaheim Ducks Dylan Sikura	To Chicago Blackhawks Maxim Golod	
March 2, 2023	To Buffalo Sabres Future considerations	To Chicago Blackhawks Anders Bjork	
March 3, 2023	To Dallas Stars Max Domi; Dylan Wells	To Chicago Blackhawks Anton Khudobin; 2nd-round pick in 2025	
March 3, 2023	To Los Angeles Kings Future considerations	To Chicago Blackhawks Austin Wagner	
June 26, 2023	To Boston Bruins Ian Mitchell; Alec Regula	To Chicago Blackhawks Nick Foligno; Taylor Hall	

Notes:

- Chicago retains 50% of McCabe's remaining contract
- Chicago retains 50% of Kane's remaining contract

=== Players acquired ===
Date	Player	Former team	Term	Via	Ref
July 13, 2022	Andreas Athanasiou	Los Angeles Kings	1-year	Free agency	
July 13, 2022	Colin Blackwell	Toronto Maple Leafs	2-year	Free agency	
July 13, 2022	Max Domi	Carolina Hurricanes	1-year	Free agency	
July 13, 2022	Luke Philp	Calgary Flames	1-year	Free agency	
July 13, 2022	Brett Seney	Toronto Maple Leafs	1-year	Free agency	
July 13, 2022	Alex Stalock	San Jose Sharks	1-year	Free agency	
July 14, 2022	Dylan Sikura	Colorado Avalanche	1-year	Free agency	
July 25, 2022	Buddy Robinson	Anaheim Ducks	1-year	Free agency	
August 17, 2022	Jack Johnson	Colorado Avalanche	1-year	Free agency	
August 18, 2022	Cole Guttman	Denver Pioneers (NCHC)	2-year†	Free agency	
October 10, 2022	Jarred Tinordi	New York Rangers		Waivers	
November 2, 2022	Dylan Wells	Rockford IceHogs (AHL)	1-year	Free agency	

=== Players lost ===
Date	Player	New team	Term	Via	Ref
July 13, 2022	Collin Delia	Vancouver Canucks	1-year	Free agency	
July 13, 2022	Erik Gustafsson	Washington Capitals	1-year	Free agency	
July 13, 2022	Wyatt Kalynuk	Vancouver Canucks	1-year	Free agency	
July 13, 2022	Dominik Kubalik	Detroit Red Wings	2-year	Free agency	
July 14, 2022	Henrik Borgstrom	Washington Capitals	1-year	Free agency	
July 14, 2022	Kevin Lankinen	Nashville Predators	1-year	Free agency	
July 14, 2022	Dylan Strome	Washington Capitals	1-year	Free agency	
July 26, 2022	Cale Morris	Chicago Wolves (AHL)	1-year	Free agency	
July 26, 2022	Cam Morrison	Charlotte Checkers (AHL)	1-year	Free agency	
September 5, 2022	Brett Connolly	HC Lugano (NL)	1-year	Free agency	
September 19, 2022	Kurtis Gabriel			Retirement	
October 1, 2022	Calvin de Haan	Carolina Hurricanes	1-year	Free agency	
May 9, 2023	Jakub Galvas	Malmö Redhawks (SHL)	2-year‡	Free agency	

=== Signings ===
Date	Player	Term	Ref
August 2, 2022	Jalen Luypen	3-year†	
August 10, 2022	Kevin Korchinski	3-year†	
August 12, 2022	Caleb Jones	1-year	
August 12, 2022	Philipp Kurashev	1-year	
February 23, 2023	Dave Gust	2-year	
March 9, 2023	Luke Philp	1-year‡	
March 13, 2023	Ryder Rolston	3-year†‡	
March 14, 2023	Wyatt Kaiser	3-year†	
March 25, 2023	Paul Ludwinski	3-year†‡	
March 28, 2023	Antti Saarela	2-year†‡	
March 29, 2023	Brett Seney	1-year‡	
April 3, 2023	Gavin Hayes	3-year†‡	
April 11, 2023	Drew Commesso	3-year†‡	
April 12, 2023	Jarred Tinordi	1-year‡	
May 10, 2023	Arvid Soderblom	2-year‡	
June 8, 2023	Andreas Athanasiou	2-year‡	
June 22, 2023	Joey Anderson	1-year‡	
June 27, 2023	Nick Foligno	1-year‡	

== Draft picks ==
Below are the Chicago Blackhawks' selections at the 2022 NHL entry draft, which was held on July 7 to 8, 2022, at Bell Centre in Montreal.

Round	#	Player	Pos.	Nationality	Team (League)
1	7	Kevin Korchinski	D	Canada	Seattle Thunderbirds (WHL)
1	13	Frank Nazar	C	USA	U.S. NTDP (USHL)
1	25	Sam Rinzel	D	USA	Chaska High School (USHS-MN)
2	39	Paul Ludwinski	C	Canada	Kingston Frontenacs (OHL)
2	57	Ryan Greene	C	Canada	Green Bay Gamblers (USHL)
3	66	Gavin Hayes	C	USA	Flint Firebirds (OHL)
3	81	Samuel Savoie	LW	Canada	Gatineau Olympiques (QMJHL)
3	90	Aidan Thompson	C	USA	Lincoln Stars (USHL)
6	173	Dominic James	LW	USA	Minnesota-Duluth Bulldogs (NCHC)
6	188	Nils Juntorp	RW	Sweden	HV71 (J20 Nationell)
7	199	Riku Tohila	C	Finland	JYP (U20 SM-sarja)
