= 2022–23 Toronto Maple Leafs season =

National Hockey League season

2022–23 Toronto Maple Leafs
- Division: 2nd Atlantic
- Conference: 4th Eastern
- 2022–23 record: 50–21–11
- Home record: 27–8–6
- Road record: 23–13–5
- Goals for: 279
- Goals against: 222

Team information
- General manager: Kyle Dubas
- Coach: Sheldon Keefe
- Captain: John Tavares
- Alternate captains: Mitch Marner; Auston Matthews; Jake Muzzin; Morgan Rielly
- Arena: Scotiabank Arena
- Average attendance: 18,753
- Minor league affiliates: Toronto Marlies (AHL); Newfoundland Growlers (ECHL)

Team leaders
- Goals: Auston Matthews; William Nylander (40)
- Assists: Mitch Marner (69)
- Points: Mitch Marner (99)
- Penalty minutes: Michael Bunting (103)
- Plus/minus: Auston Matthews (+31)
- Wins: Ilya Samsonov (27)
- Goals against average: Joseph Woll (2.16)

The 2022–23 Toronto Maple Leafs season was the franchise's 106th season in the National Hockey League (NHL). On March 27, 2023, the Maple Leafs clinched a playoff spot for the seventh year in a row after the Ottawa Senators defeated the Florida Panthers. On April 29, the Maple Leafs won their First Round series against the Tampa Bay Lightning, which was the first playoff series win for the franchise since 2004. In the Second Round, the Maple Leafs lost to the Florida Panthers in five games.

== Standings ==
=== Divisional standings ===
Atlantic Division
Pos	Team	GP	W	L	OTL	RW	GF	GA	GD	Pts
1	p – Boston Bruins	82	65	12	5	54	305	177	+128	135
2	x – Toronto Maple Leafs	82	50	21	11	42	279	222	+57	111
3	x – Tampa Bay Lightning	82	46	30	6	38	283	254	+29	98
4	x – Florida Panthers	82	42	32	8	36	290	273	+17	92
5	Buffalo Sabres	82	42	33	7	30	296	300	−4	91
6	Ottawa Senators	82	39	35	8	31	261	271	−10	86
7	Detroit Red Wings	82	35	37	10	28	240	279	−39	80
8	Montreal Canadiens	82	31	45	6	21	232	307	−75	68

Source: National Hockey League
Rules for classification: 1) Fewer number of games played (GP, only during regular season); 2) Greater number of regulation wins (RW); 3) Greater number of wins in regulation and overtime, excluding shootout wins (ROW); 4) Greater number of total wins, including shootouts (W); 5) Greater number of points earned in head-to-head play; if teams played an uneven number of head-to-head games, the result of the first game on the home ice of the team with the extra home game is discarded; 6) Greater goal differential (GD); 7) Greater number of goals scored (GF)
p – Clinched Presidents' Trophy; x – Clinched playoff spot

=== Conference standings ===
Eastern Conference Wild Card
Pos	Div	Team	GP	W	L	OTL	RW	GF	GA	GD	Pts
1	ME	x – New York Islanders	82	42	31	9	36	243	222	+21	93
2	AT	x – Florida Panthers	82	42	32	8	36	290	273	+17	92
3	ME	Pittsburgh Penguins	82	40	31	11	31	262	264	−2	91
4	AT	Buffalo Sabres	82	42	33	7	30	296	300	−4	91
5	AT	Ottawa Senators	82	39	35	8	31	261	271	−10	86
6	AT	Detroit Red Wings	82	35	37	10	28	240	279	−39	80
7	ME	Washington Capitals	82	35	37	10	27	255	265	−10	80
8	ME	Philadelphia Flyers	82	31	38	13	26	222	277	−55	75
9	AT	Montreal Canadiens	82	31	45	6	21	232	307	−75	68
10	ME	Columbus Blue Jackets	82	25	48	9	15	214	330	−116	59

Source: National Hockey League
Rules for classification: 1) Fewer number of games played (GP, only during regular season); 2) Greater number of regulation wins (RW); 3) Greater number of wins in regulation and overtime, excluding shootout wins (ROW); 4) Greater number of total wins, including shootouts (W); 5) Greater number of points earned in head-to-head play; if teams played an uneven number of head-to-head games, the result of the first game on the home ice of the team with the extra home game is discarded; 6) Greater goal differential (GD); 7) Greater number of goals scored (GF)
x – Clinched playoff spot

== Schedule and results ==
=== Preseason ===
2022 preseason: 5–2–0 (home: 3–1–0; road: 2–1–0)

Game	Date	Opponent	Score	OT	Decision	Location	Attendance	Record	Recap
1	September 24	Ottawa Senators (split squad)	4–1		Kallgren (1–0–0)	Scotiabank Arena	14,532	1–0–0	
2	September 24	Ottawa Senators (split squad)	2–4		Petruzzelli (0–1–0)	Scotiabank Arena	14,241	1–1–0	
3	September 28	Montreal Canadiens	3–0		Murray (1–0–0)	Scotiabank Arena	17,519	2–1–0	
4	September 30	@ Ottawa Senators	6–3		Samsonov (1–0–0)	CAA Arena	4,307	3–1–0	
5	October 3	@ Montreal Canadiens	5–1		Murray (2–0–0)	Bell Centre	19,636	4–1–0	
6	October 7	@ Detroit Red Wings	2–4		Samsonov (1–1–0)	Little Caesars Arena	15,246	4–2–0	
7	October 8	Detroit Red Wings	5–1		Murray (3–0–0)	Scotiabank Arena	18,347	5–2–0	

=== Regular season ===
2022–23 game log: 50–21–11, 111 points (home: 27–8–6; road: 23–13–5)
October: 4–4–2, 10 points (home: 3–1–0; road: 1–3–2)

Game	Date	Opponent	Score	OT	Decision	Location	Attendance	Record	Points	Recap
1	October 12	@ Montreal Canadiens	3–4		Murray (0–1–0)	Bell Centre	21,105	0–1–0	0	
2	October 13	Washington Capitals	3–2		Samsonov (1–0–0)	Scotiabank Arena	18,914	1–1–0	2	
3	October 15	Ottawa Senators	3–2		Samsonov (2–0–0)	Scotiabank Arena	18,709	2–1–0	4	
4	October 17	Arizona Coyotes	2–4		Kallgren (0–1–0)	Scotiabank Arena	18,346	2–2–0	4	
5	October 20	Dallas Stars	3–2	OT	Samsonov (3–0–0)	Scotiabank Arena	18,488	3–2–0	6	
6	October 22	@ Winnipeg Jets	4–1		Samsonov (4–0–0)	Canada Life Centre	15,325	4–2–0	8	
7	October 24	@ Vegas Golden Knights	1–3		Samsonov (4–1–0)	T-Mobile Arena	17,989	4–3–0	8	
8	October 27	@ San Jose Sharks	3–4	OT	Kallgren (0–1–1)	SAP Center	12,507	4–3–1	9	
9	October 29	@ Los Angeles Kings	2–4		Samsonov (4–2–0)	Crypto.com Arena	17,530	4–4–1	9	
10	October 30	@ Anaheim Ducks	3–4	OT	Kallgren (0–1–2)	Honda Center	16,084	4–4–2	10	

November: 11–1–3, 25 points (home: 5–1–3; road: 6–0–0)

Game	Date	Opponent	Score	OT	Decision	Location	Attendance	Record	Points	Recap
11	November 2	Philadelphia Flyers	5–2		Samsonov (5–2–0)	Scotiabank Arena	18,437	5–4–2	12	
12	November 5	Boston Bruins	2–1		Samsonov (6–2–0)	Scotiabank Arena	18,926	6–4–2	14	
13	November 6	@ Carolina Hurricanes	3–1		Kallgren (1–1–2)	PNC Arena	18,463	7–4–2	16	
14	November 8	Vegas Golden Knights	3–4	OT	Kallgren (1–1–3)	Scotiabank Arena	18,459	7–4–3	17	
15	November 11	Pittsburgh Penguins	2–4		Kallgren (1–2–3)	Scotiabank Arena	19,229	7–5–3	17	
16	November 12	Vancouver Canucks	3–2		Kallgren (2–2–3)	Scotiabank Arena	19,497	8–5–3	19	
17	November 15	@ Pittsburgh Penguins	5–2		Murray (1–1–0)	PPG Paints Arena	17,035	9–5–3	21	
18	November 17	New Jersey Devils	2–3	OT	Murray (1–1–1)	Scotiabank Arena	18,189	9–5–4	22	
19	November 19	Buffalo Sabres	5–2		Murray (2–1–1)	Scotiabank Arena	18,645	10–5–4	24	
20	November 21	New York Islanders	2–3	OT	Kallgren (2–2–4)	Scotiabank Arena	18,494	10–5–5	25	
21	November 23	@ New Jersey Devils	2–1		Murray (3–1–1)	Prudential Center	16,514	11–5–5	27	
22	November 25	@ Minnesota Wild	4–3		Murray (4–1–1)	Xcel Energy Center	18,997	12–5–5	29	
23	November 26	@ Pittsburgh Penguins	4–1		Kallgren (3–2–4)	PPG Paints Arena	18,166	13–5–5	31	
24	November 28	@ Detroit Red Wings	4–2		Murray (5–1–1)	Little Caesars Arena	18,277	14–5–5	33	
25	November 30	San Jose Sharks	3–1		Samsonov (7–2–0)	Scotiabank Arena	18,679	15–5–5	35	

December: 8–3–1, 17 points (home: 5–0–0; road: 3–3–1)

Game	Date	Opponent	Score	OT	Decision	Location	Attendance	Record	Points	Recap
26	December 3	@ Tampa Bay Lightning	3–4	OT	Murray (5–1–2)	Amalie Arena	19,092	15–5–6	36	
27	December 6	@ Dallas Stars	4–0		Murray (6–1–2)	American Airlines Center	18,021	16–5–6	38	
28	December 8	Los Angeles Kings	5–0		Samsonov (8–2–0)	Scotiabank Arena	18,567	17–5–6	40	
29	December 10	Calgary Flames	5–4	OT	Murray (7–1–2)	Scotiabank Arena	18,857	18–5–6	42	
30	December 13	Anaheim Ducks	7–0		Samsonov (9–2–0)	Scotiabank Arena	18,477	19–5–6	44	
31	December 15	@ New York Rangers	1–3		Murray (7–2–2)	Madison Square Garden	18,006	19–6–6	44	
32	December 17	@ Washington Capitals	2–5		Samsonov (9–3–0)	Capital One Arena	18,573	19–7–6	44	
33	December 20	Tampa Bay Lightning	4–1		Murray (8–2–2)	Scotiabank Arena	18,962	20–7–6	46	
34	December 22	Philadelphia Flyers	4–3		Samsonov (10–3–0)	Scotiabank Arena	18,908	21–7–6	48	
35	December 27	@ St. Louis Blues	5–4	OT	Samsonov (11–3–0)	Enterprise Center	18,096	22–7–6	50	
36	December 29	@ Arizona Coyotes	3–6		Murray (8–3–2)	Mullett Arena	4,600	22–8–6	50	
37	December 31	@ Colorado Avalanche	6–2		Murray (9–3–2)	Ball Arena	18,136	23–8–6	52	

January: 8–4–2, 18 points (home: 7–2–1; road: 1–2–1)

Game	Date	Opponent	Score	OT	Decision	Location	Attendance	Record	Points	Recap
38	January 3	St. Louis Blues	5–6	SO	Samsonov (11–3–1)	Scotiabank Arena	18,553	23–8–7	53	
39	January 5	Seattle Kraken	1–5		Murray (9–4–2)	Scotiabank Arena	18,624	23–9–7	53	
40	January 7	Detroit Red Wings	4–1		Samsonov (12–3–1)	Scotiabank Arena	19,101	24–9–7	55	
41	January 8	@ Philadelphia Flyers	6–2		Murray (10–4–2)	Wells Fargo Center	17,862	25–9–7	57	
42	January 11	Nashville Predators	2–1		Murray (11–4–2)	Scotiabank Arena	18,638	26–9–7	59	
43	January 12	@ Detroit Red Wings	1–4		Samsonov (12–4–1)	Little Caesars Arena	19,515	26–10–7	59	
44	January 14	@ Boston Bruins	3–4		Murray (11–5–2)	TD Garden	17,850	26–11–7	59	
45	January 17	Florida Panthers	5–4	OT	Samsonov (13–4–1)	Scotiabank Arena	18,573	27–11–7	61	
46	January 19	Winnipeg Jets	4–1		Samsonov (14–4–1)	Scotiabank Arena	18,644	28–11–7	63	
47	January 21	@ Montreal Canadiens	2–3	OT	Samsonov (14–4–2)	Bell Centre	21,105	28–11–8	64	
48	January 23	New York Islanders	5–2		Samsonov (15–4–2)	Scotiabank Arena	18,514	29–11–8	66	
49	January 25	New York Rangers	3–2	OT	Samsonov (16–4–2)	Scotiabank Arena	18,114	30–11–8	68	
50	January 27	Ottawa Senators	2–6		Samsonov (16–5–2)	Scotiabank Arena	18,727	30–12–8	68	
51	January 29	Washington Capitals	5–1		Samsonov (17–5–2)	Scotiabank Arena	18,593	31–12–8	70	

February: 6–3–0, 12 points (home: 3–2–0; road: 3–1–0)

Game	Date	Opponent	Score	OT	Decision	Location	Attendance	Record	Points	Recap
52	February 1	Boston Bruins	2–5		Samsonov (17–6–2)	Scotiabank Arena	18,973	31–13–8	70	
53	February 10	@ Columbus Blue Jackets	3–0		Samsonov (18–6–2)	Nationwide Arena	18,860	32–13–8	72	
54	February 11	Columbus Blue Jackets	3–4		Woll (0–1–0)	Scotiabank Arena	18,893	32–14–8	72	
55	February 15	Chicago Blackhawks	5–2		Samsonov (19–6–2)	Scotiabank Arena	18,882	33–14–8	74	
56	February 18	Montreal Canadiens	5–1		Woll (1–1–0)	Scotiabank Arena	19,535	34–14–8	76	
57	February 19	@ Chicago Blackhawks	3–5		Samsonov (19–7–2)	United Center	20,979	34–15–8	76	
58	February 21	@ Buffalo Sabres	6–3		Samsonov (20–7–2)	KeyBank Center	18,641	35–15–8	78	
59	February 24	Minnesota Wild	2–1	OT	Samsonov (21–7–2)	Scotiabank Arena	18,575	36–15–8	80	
60	February 26	@ Seattle Kraken	5–1		Samsonov (22–7–2)	Climate Pledge Arena	17,151	37–15–8	82	

March: 7–5–2, 16 points (home: 2–1–2; road: 5–4–0)

Game	Date	Opponent	Score	OT	Decision	Location	Attendance	Record	Points	Recap
61	March 1	@ Edmonton Oilers	2–5		Samsonov (22–8–2)	Rogers Place	18,347	37–16–8	82	
62	March 2	@ Calgary Flames	2–1		Woll (2–1–0)	Scotiabank Saddledome	19,289	38–16–8	84	
63	March 4	@ Vancouver Canucks	1–4		Murray (11–6–2)	Rogers Arena	18,905	38–17–8	84	
64	March 7	@ New Jersey Devils	4–3		Samsonov (23–8–2)	Prudential Center	16,514	39–17–8	86	
65	March 11	Edmonton Oilers	7–4		Murray (12–6–2)	Scotiabank Arena	19,549	40–17–8	88	
66	March 13	Buffalo Sabres	3–4		Murray (12–7–2)	Scotiabank Arena	18,688	40–18–8	88	
67	March 15	Colorado Avalanche	1–2	SO	Samsonov (23–8–3)	Scotiabank Arena	19,102	40–18–9	89	
68	March 17	Carolina Hurricanes	5–2		Samsonov (24–8–3)	Scotiabank Arena	18,607	41–18–9	91	
69	March 18	@ Ottawa Senators	5–4	SO	Murray (13–7–2)	Canadian Tire Centre	20,092	42–18–9	93	
70	March 21	@ New York Islanders	2–7		Samsonov (24–9–3)	UBS Arena	17,255	42–19–9	93	
71	March 23	@ Florida Panthers	6–2		Murray (14–7–2)	FLA Live Arena	16,704	43–19–9	95	
72	March 25	@ Carolina Hurricanes	3–5		Murray (14–8–2)	PNC Arena	18,895	43–20–9	95	
73	March 26	@ Nashville Predators	3–2		Woll (3–1–0)	Bridgestone Arena	17,411	44–20–9	97	
74	March 29	Florida Panthers	2–3	OT	Samsonov (24–9–4)	Scotiabank Arena	18,894	44–20–10	98	

April: 6–1–1, 13 points (home: 2–1–0; road: 4–0–1)

Game	Date	Opponent	Score	OT	Decision	Location	Attendance	Record	Points	Recap
75	April 1	@ Ottawa Senators	3–0		Samsonov (25–9–4)	Canadian Tire Centre	20,097	45–20–10	100	
76	April 2	Detroit Red Wings	2–5		Samsonov (25–10–4)	Scotiabank Arena	18,675	45–21–10	100	
77	April 4	Columbus Blue Jackets	4–2		Woll (4–1–0)	Scotiabank Arena	18,597	46–21–10	102	
78	April 6	@ Boston Bruins	1–2	OT	Samsonov (25–10–5)	TD Garden	17,850	46–21–11	103	
79	April 8	Montreal Canadiens	7–1		Samsonov (26–10–5)	Scotiabank Arena	19,033	47–21–11	105	
80	April 10	@ Florida Panthers	2–1	OT	Samsonov (27–10–5)	FLA Live Arena	18,521	48–21–11	107	
81	April 11	@ Tampa Bay Lightning	4–3		Woll (5–1–0)	Amalie Arena	19,092	49–21–11	109	
82	April 13	@ New York Rangers	3–2		Woll (6–1–0)	Madison Square Garden	17,623	50–21–11	111	

2022–23 schedule

Win (2 Points) Loss (0 points) Overtime/shootout loss (1 point)

=== Playoffs ===
2023 Stanley Cup playoffs
Eastern Conference First Round vs. (A3) Tampa Bay Lightning: Toronto won 4–2

Game	Date	Opponent	Score	OT	Decision	Location	Attendance	Series	Recap
1	April 18	Tampa Bay Lightning	3–7		Samsonov (0–1)	Scotiabank Arena	19,013	0–1	
2	April 20	Tampa Bay Lightning	7–2		Samsonov (1–1)	Scotiabank Arena	19,128	1–1	
3	April 22	@ Tampa Bay Lightning	4–3	OT	Samsonov (2–1)	Amalie Arena	19,092	2–1	
4	April 24	@ Tampa Bay Lightning	5–4	OT	Samsonov (3–1)	Amalie Arena	19,092	3–1	
5	April 27	Tampa Bay Lightning	2–4		Samsonov (3–2)	Scotiabank Arena	19,663	3–2	
6	April 29	@ Tampa Bay Lightning	2–1	OT	Samsonov (4–2)	Amalie Arena	19,092	4–2	

Eastern Conference Second Round vs. (WC2) Florida Panthers: Florida won 4–1

Game	Date	Opponent	Score	OT	Decision	Location	Attendance	Series	Recap
1	May 2	Florida Panthers	2–4		Samsonov (4–3)	Scotiabank Arena	19,244	0–1	
2	May 4	Florida Panthers	2–3		Samsonov (4–4)	Scotiabank Arena	19,387	0–2	
3	May 7	@ Florida Panthers	2–3	OT	Woll (0–1)	FLA Live Arena	19,911	0–3	
4	May 10	@ Florida Panthers	2–1		Woll (1–1)	FLA Live Arena	19,868	1–3	
5	May 12	Florida Panthers	2–3	OT	Woll (1–2)	Scotiabank Arena	19,513	1–4	

Win Loss

== Player statistics ==
=== Skaters ===
Regular season
Player	GP	G	A	Pts	+/−	PIM
Mitch Marner	80	30	69	99	18	28
William Nylander	82	40	47	87	10	28
Auston Matthews	74	40	45	85	31	20
John Tavares	80	36	44	80	−7	34
Michael Bunting	82	23	26	49	21	103
Morgan Rielly	65	4	37	41	−9	21
Calle Jarnkrok	73	20	19	39	9	14
Alexander Kerfoot	82	10	22	32	8	30
David Kampf	82	7	20	27	6	8
Mark Giordano	78	4	20	24	27	53
Pierre Engvall ^{(X)}	58	12	9	21	1	25
Rasmus Sandin ^{(X)}	52	4	16	20	10	23
Timothy Liljegren	67	6	12	18	24	30
Justin Holl	80	2	16	18	15	39
Zach Aston-Reese	77	10	4	14	−6	25
Conor Timmins	25	2	12	14	1	8
T.J. Brodie	58	2	12	14	10	14
Pontus Holmberg ^{(M)}	37	5	8	13	0	18
Ryan O'Reilly	13	4	7	11	3	6
Sam Lafferty	19	2	4	6	−1	9
Noel Acciari	23	4	1	5	2	11
Nicholas Robertson	15	2	3	5	2	0
Jake McCabe	21	1	4	5	12	29
Denis Malgin ^{(X)}	23	2	2	4	−1	4
Erik Gustafsson	9	0	4	4	0	2
Joey Anderson ^{(X)}	14	2	1	3	1	0
Jordie Benn ^{(M)}	12	1	1	2	−1	12
Nick Abruzzese ^{(M)}	2	0	2	2	1	0
Mac Hollowell ^{(M)}	6	0	2	2	3	2
Victor Mete	11	0	2	2	3	4
Wayne Simmonds ^{(M)}	18	0	2	2	1	49
Radim Zohorna ^{(M)}	2	1	0	1	1	0
Dryden Hunt ^{(X)}	9	1	0	1	−2	9
Luke Schenn	15	1	0	1	−1	13
Matthew Knies	3	0	1	1	1	2
Bobby McMann	10	0	1	1	−2	2
Kyle Clifford ^{(M)}	2	0	1	1	1	2
Jake Muzzin	4	0	1	1	0	2
Alex Steeves ^{(M)}	3	0	0	0	−2	0
Semyon Der-Arguchintsev ^{(M)}	1	0	0	0	1	0
Filip Kral ^{(M)}	2	0	0	0	0	2
Nicolas Aube-Kubel ^{(X)}	6	0	0	0	−1	4

Playoffs
Player	GP	G	A	Pts	+/−	PIM
Mitch Marner	11	3	11	14	7	2
Morgan Rielly	11	4	8	12	11	6
Auston Matthews	11	5	6	11	2	7
William Nylander	11	4	6	10	−4	2
Ryan O'Reilly	11	3	6	9	−3	5
John Tavares	11	4	4	8	−1	4
Matthew Knies	7	1	3	4	3	4
Sam Lafferty	9	1	2	3	−1	2
Calle Jarnkrok	11	1	2	3	1	0
T. J. Brodie	11	0	3	3	−3	12
David Kampf	11	0	3	3	−1	4
Noel Acciari	11	2	0	2	−3	2
Alexander Kerfoot	11	2	0	2	1	4
Michael Bunting	7	1	1	2	−1	15
Mark Giordano	11	0	2	2	−7	7
Jake McCabe	11	0	2	2	−7	10
Erik Gustafsson	2	1	0	1	0	0
Zach Aston-Reese	6	1	0	1	−2	0
Justin Holl	8	0	1	1	−7	11
Luke Schenn	11	0	1	1	8	11
Timothy Liljegren	5	0	0	0	−1	0

=== Goaltenders ===
Regular season
Player	GP	GS	TOI	W	L	OT	GA	GAA	SA	SV%	SO	G	A	PIM
Ilya Samsonov	42	40	2,475:36	27	10	5	96	2.33	1,184	.919	4	0	2	0
Matt Murray	26	26	1,473:10	14	8	2	74	3.01	761	.903	1	0	0	0
Joseph Woll	7	7	416:26	6	1	0	15	2.16	219	.932	0	0	0	0
Erik Kallgren ^{(M)}	10	9	561:40	3	2	4	25	2.67	246	.898	0	0	0	0
Jett Alexander ^{(X)}	1	0	1:10	0	0	0	0	0.00	0	.000	0	0	0	0

Playoffs
Player	GP	GS	TOI	W	L	GA	GAA	SA	SV%	SO	G	A	PIM
Ilya Samsonov	9	9	498:09	4	4	26	3.13	255	.898	0	0	0	0
Joseph Woll	4	2	197:55	1	2	8	2.43	94	.915	0	0	0	0

^{(M)} Player was playing for the minor league affiliate Toronto Marlies of the AHL at end of regular season
^{(X)} Player was no longer with the Maple Leafs organization by the end of regular season

Bold/italics denotes franchise record.

== Transactions ==
The Maple Leafs have been involved in the following transactions during the 2022–23 season.

=== Key ===
† Contract is entry-level.
‡ Contract initially takes effect in the 2023–24 season.

=== Trades ===
Date	Details		Ref
July 7, 2022	To Chicago Blackhawks Petr Mrazek; 1st-round pick in 2022	To Toronto Maple Leafs CHI 2nd-round pick in 2022	
July 8, 2022	To Vegas Golden Knights WPG 3rd-round pick in 2022	To Toronto Maple Leafs NYR 3rd-round pick in 2022; CHI 5th-round pick in 2022	
July 8, 2022	To Nashville Predators 4th-round pick in 2023	To Toronto Maple Leafs TOR 4th-round pick in 2022	
July 11, 2022	To Ottawa Senators Future considerations	To Toronto Maple Leafs Matt Murray^{1} 3rd-round pick in 2023; 7th-round pick in 2024	
November 23, 2022	To Arizona Coyotes Curtis Douglas	To Toronto Maple Leafs Conor Timmins	
December 19, 2022	To Colorado Avalanche Denis Malgin	To Toronto Maple Leafs Dryden Hunt	
February 17, 2023	To Minnesota Wild 4th-round pick in 2025	To Toronto Maple Leafs Ryan O'Reilly	
February 17, 2023	To St. Louis Blues Mikhail Abramov; Adam Gaudette; 1st-round pick in 2023; OTT 3rd-round pick in 2023; 2nd-round pick in 2024	To Toronto Maple Leafs Noel Acciari; Josh Pillar	
February 27, 2023	To Chicago Blackhawks Joey Anderson; Pavel Gogolev; Conditional 1st-round pick in 2025; 2nd-round pick in 2026	To Toronto Maple Leafs Sam Lafferty; Jake McCabe^{2} Conditional 5th-round pick in 2024; Conditional 3rd-round pick in 2025	
February 28, 2023	To Washington Capitals Rasmus Sandin	To Toronto Maple Leafs Erik Gustafsson; BOS 1st-round pick in 2023	
February 28, 2023	To New York Islanders Pierre Engvall	To Toronto Maple Leafs 3rd-round pick in 2024	
February 28, 2023	To Vancouver Canucks 3rd-round pick in 2023	To Toronto Maple Leafs Luke Schenn	
March 3, 2023	To Calgary Flames Dryden Hunt	To Toronto Maple Leafs Radim Zohorna	

==== Notes ====
1. Ottawa retains 25% of Murray's remaining contract.
2. Chicago retains 50% of McCabe's remaining contract.

=== Players acquired ===
Date	Player	Former team	Term	Via	Ref
July 13, 2022	Nicolas Aube-Kubel	Colorado Avalanche	1-year	Free agency	
July 13, 2022	Adam Gaudette	Ottawa Senators	1-year	Free agency	
July 13, 2022	Ilya Samsonov	Washington Capitals	1-year	Free agency	
July 14, 2022	Jordie Benn	Minnesota Wild	1-year	Free agency	
July 14, 2022	Victor Mete	Ottawa Senators	1-year	Free agency	
July 15, 2022	Calle Jarnkrok	Calgary Flames	4-year	Free agency	
October 9, 2022	Zach Aston-Reese	Anaheim Ducks	1-year	Free agency	
November 6, 2022	Keith Petruzzelli	Toronto Marlies (AHL)	2-year†	Free agency	

=== Players lost ===
Date	Player	New team	Term	Via	Ref
July 13, 2022	Colin Blackwell	Chicago Blackhawks	2-year	Free agency	
July 13, 2022	Jack Campbell	Edmonton Oilers	5-year	Free agency	
July 13, 2022	Michael Hutchinson	Vegas Golden Knights	1-year	Free agency	
July 13, 2022	Ondrej Kase	Carolina Hurricanes	1-year	Free agency	
July 13, 2022	Ilya Lyubushkin	Buffalo Sabres	2-year	Free agency	
July 13, 2022	Ilya Mikheyev	Vancouver Canucks	4-year	Free agency	
July 13, 2022	Kristians Rubins	Ottawa Senators	1-year	Free agency	
July 13, 2022	Brett Seney	Chicago Blackhawks	1-year	Free agency	
August 8, 2022	Teemu Kivihalme	TPS (Liiga)	1-year	Free agency	
August 24, 2022	Chad Krys	Vienna Capitals (ICEHL)	N/A	Free agency	
August 30, 2022	Joseph Duszak	HC Dinamo Minsk (KHL)	1-year	Free agency	
November 5, 2022	Nicolas Aube-Kubel	Washington Capitals		Waivers	
December 16, 2022	Axel Rindell			Contract termination	
December 17, 2022	Axel Rindell	Timrå IK (SHL)	2-year	Free agency	
June 1, 2023	Carl Dahlstrom	Färjestad BK (SHL)	3-year‡	Free agency	

=== Signings ===
Date	Player	Term	Ref
July 13, 2022	Dennis Hildeby	3-year†	
July 13, 2022	Denis Malgin	1-year	
July 17, 2022	Pierre Engvall	1-year	
September 29, 2022	Rasmus Sandin	2-year	
October 13, 2022	Fraser Minten	3-year†	
February 9, 2023	Conor Timmins	2-year‡	
March 15, 2023	Ryan Tverberg	3-year†‡	
April 9, 2023	Matthew Knies	3-year†	
May 15, 2023	Vyacheslav Peksa	3-year†‡	

== Draft picks ==
Below are the Toronto Maple Leafs' selections at the 2022 NHL entry draft, which was held on July 7 to 8, 2022, at Bell Centre in Montreal.

Round	#	Player	Pos.	Nationality	Team (League)
2	38	Fraser Minten	C	Canada	Kamloops Blazers (WHL)
3	95	Nicholas Moldenhauer	C	Canada	Chicago Steel (USHL)
4	122	Dennis Hildeby	G	Sweden	Färjestad BK (SHL)
5	135	Nikita Grebyonkin	RW	Russia	Stalnye Lisy Magnitogorsk (MHL)
7	218	Brandon Lisowsky	LW	Canada	Saskatoon Blades (WHL)
