= 2022–23 New Jersey Devils season =

National Hockey League season

2022–23 New Jersey Devils
- Division: 2nd Metropolitan
- Conference: 3rd Eastern
- 2022–23 record: 52–22–8
- Home record: 24–13–4
- Road record: 28–9–4
- Goals for: 291
- Goals against: 226

Team information
- General manager: Tom Fitzgerald
- Coach: Lindy Ruff
- Captain: Nico Hischier
- Alternate captains: Jack Hughes; Ondrej Palat
- Arena: Prudential Center
- Average attendance: 15,207
- Minor league affiliates: Utica Comets (AHL); Adirondack Thunder (ECHL)

Team leaders
- Goals: Jack Hughes (43)
- Assists: Jack Hughes (56)
- Points: Jack Hughes (99)
- Penalty minutes: Miles Wood (76)
- Plus/minus: Tomáš Tatar (+41)
- Wins: Vítek Vaněček (33)
- Goals against average: Akira Schmid (2.13)

The 2022–23 New Jersey Devils season was the 49th season for the National Hockey League (NHL) franchise that was established on June 11, 1974, and 41st season since the franchise relocated from Colorado prior to the 1982–83 NHL season. This season saw the Devils clinch a playoff spot for the first time since 2018 following a win over the Ottawa Senators on March 25, 2023. On April 6, the team recorded its second 50-win season in franchise history. In the first round of the 2023 Stanley Cup playoffs, the Devils defeated the New York Rangers in a seven-game series. It was their first playoff series win since the 2011–12 season, which was also against the Rangers. They were then defeated by the Carolina Hurricanes in five games in the second round.

== Standings ==
=== Divisional standings ===
Metropolitan Division
Pos	Team	GP	W	L	OTL	RW	GF	GA	GD	Pts
1	y – Carolina Hurricanes	82	52	21	9	39	266	213	+53	113
2	x – New Jersey Devils	82	52	22	8	39	291	226	+65	112
3	x – New York Rangers	82	47	22	13	37	277	219	+58	107
4	x – New York Islanders	82	42	31	9	36	243	222	+21	93
5	Pittsburgh Penguins	82	40	31	11	31	262	264	−2	91
6	Washington Capitals	82	35	37	10	27	255	265	−10	80
7	Philadelphia Flyers	82	31	38	13	26	222	277	−55	75
8	Columbus Blue Jackets	82	25	48	9	15	214	330	−116	59

Source: National Hockey League
Rules for classification: 1) Fewer number of games played (GP, only during regular season); 2) Greater number of regulation wins (RW); 3) Greater number of wins in regulation and overtime, excluding shootout wins (ROW); 4) Greater number of total wins, including shootouts (W); 5) Greater number of points earned in head-to-head play; if teams played an uneven number of head-to-head games, the result of the first game on the home ice of the team with the extra home game is discarded; 6) Greater goal differential (GD); 7) Greater number of goals scored (GF)
x – Clinched playoff spot; y – Clinched division

=== Conference standings ===
Eastern Conference Wild Card
Pos	Div	Team	GP	W	L	OTL	RW	GF	GA	GD	Pts
1	ME	x – New York Islanders	82	42	31	9	36	243	222	+21	93
2	AT	x – Florida Panthers	82	42	32	8	36	290	273	+17	92
3	ME	Pittsburgh Penguins	82	40	31	11	31	262	264	−2	91
4	AT	Buffalo Sabres	82	42	33	7	30	296	300	−4	91
5	AT	Ottawa Senators	82	39	35	8	31	261	271	−10	86
6	AT	Detroit Red Wings	82	35	37	10	28	240	279	−39	80
7	ME	Washington Capitals	82	35	37	10	27	255	265	−10	80
8	ME	Philadelphia Flyers	82	31	38	13	26	222	277	−55	75
9	AT	Montreal Canadiens	82	31	45	6	21	232	307	−75	68
10	ME	Columbus Blue Jackets	82	25	48	9	15	214	330	−116	59

Source: National Hockey League
Rules for classification: 1) Fewer number of games played (GP, only during regular season); 2) Greater number of regulation wins (RW); 3) Greater number of wins in regulation and overtime, excluding shootout wins (ROW); 4) Greater number of total wins, including shootouts (W); 5) Greater number of points earned in head-to-head play; if teams played an uneven number of head-to-head games, the result of the first game on the home ice of the team with the extra home game is discarded; 6) Greater goal differential (GD); 7) Greater number of goals scored (GF)
x – Clinched playoff spot

== Schedule and results ==
=== Preseason ===
The preseason schedule was published on June 28, 2022.

2022 preseason game log: 5–2–0 (home: 2–1–0; road: 3–1–0)
#	Date	Visitor	Score	Home	OT	Decision	Attendance	Record	Recap
1	September 26	New Jersey	2–1	Montreal		Daws	19,308	1–0–0
2	September 27	NY Islanders	1–4	New Jersey		Vaněček	5,526	2–0–0
3	September 29	New Jersey	5–2	NY Rangers		Vaněček	14,237	3–0–0
4	September 30	NY Rangers	2–1	New Jersey		Blackwood	11,068	3–1–0
5	October 3	Boston	0–1	New Jersey		Vaněček	5,077	4–1–0
6	October 6	New Jersey	2–5	NY Islanders		Blackwood	7,512	4–2–0
7	October 8	New Jersey	5–3	Boston		Vaněček	17,850	5–2–0

=== Regular season ===
The regular season schedule was published on July 6, 2022.

2022–23 game log

October: 6–3–0 (home: 4–2–0; road: 2–1–0)
#	Date	Visitor	Score	Home	OT	Decision	Attendance	Record	Pts	Recap
1	October 13	New Jersey	2–5	Philadelphia		Blackwood	19,107	0–1–0	0
2	October 15	Detroit	5–2	New Jersey		Vaněček	16,514	0–2–0	0
3	October 18	Anaheim	2–4	New Jersey		Blackwood	10,130	1–2–0	2
4	October 20	New Jersey	4–1	NY Islanders		Blackwood	16,046	2–2–0	4
5	October 22	San Jose	1–2	New Jersey		Blackwood	11,037	3–2–0	6
6	October 24	Washington	6–3	New Jersey		Blackwood	11,405	3–3–0	6
7	October 25	New Jersey	6–2	Detroit		Vaněček	16,546	4–3–0	8
8	October 28	Colorado	0–1	New Jersey		Vaněček	12,502	5–3–0	10
9	October 30	Columbus	1–7	New Jersey		Vaněček	11,547	6–3–0	12

November: 13–1–0 (home: 5–1–0; road: 8–0–0)
#	Date	Visitor	Score	Home	OT	Decision	Attendance	Record	Pts	Recap
10	November 1	New Jersey	5–2	Vancouver		Blackwood	18,548	7–3–0	14
11	November 3	New Jersey	4–3	Edmonton		Vaněček	17,021	8–3–0	16
12	November 5	New Jersey	4–3	Calgary	OT	Vaněček	17,386	9–3–0	18
13	November 8	Calgary	2–3	New Jersey		Vaněček	13,096	10–3–0	20
14	November 10	Ottawa	3–4	New Jersey	OT	Schmid	13,806	11–3–0	22
15	November 12	Arizona	2–4	New Jersey		Schmid	16,514	12–3–0	24
16	November 15	New Jersey	5–1	Montreal		Vaněček	20,753	13–3–0	26
17	November 17	New Jersey	3–2	Toronto	OT	Vaněček	18,189	14–3–0	28
18	November 19	New Jersey	5–1	Ottawa		Schmid	18,881	15–3–0	30
19	November 21	Edmonton	2–5	New Jersey		Vaněček	16,514	16–3–0	32
20	November 23	Toronto	2–1	New Jersey		Vaněček	16,514	16–4–0	32
21	November 25	New Jersey	3–1	Buffalo		Schmid	16,727	17–4–0	34
22	November 26	Washington	1–5	New Jersey		Vaněček	16,514	18–4–0	36
23	November 28	New Jersey	5–3	NY Rangers		Vaněček	17,928	19–4–0	38

December: 4–7–2 (home: 1–6–1; road: 3–1–1)
#	Date	Visitor	Score	Home	OT	Decision	Attendance	Record	Pts	Recap
24	December 1	Nashville	4–3	New Jersey	OT	Vaněček	14,071	19–4–1	39
25	December 3	New Jersey	3–2	Philadelphia		Schmid	18,427	20–4–1	41
26	December 6	Chicago	0–3	New Jersey		Vaněček	13,071	21–4–1	43
27	December 9	NY Islanders	6–4	New Jersey		Schmid	16,514	21–5–1	43
28	December 12	New Jersey	3–4	NY Rangers	OT	Vaněček	18,006	21–5–2	44
29	December 13	Dallas	4–1	New Jersey		Schmid	13,114	21–6–2	44
30	December 15	Philadelphia	2–1	New Jersey		Vaněček	14,137	21–7–2	44
31	December 17	Florida	4–2	New Jersey		Schmid	15,082	21–8–2	44
32	December 20	New Jersey	1–4	Carolina		Vaněček	18,680	21–9–2	44
33	December 21	New Jersey	4–2	Florida		Blackwood	17,073	22–9–2	46
34	December 23	Boston	4–3	New Jersey		Blackwood	16,514	22–10–2	46
35	December 28	Boston	3–1	New Jersey		Vaněček	16,514	22–11–2	46
36	December 30	New Jersey	4–2	Pittsburgh		Vaněček	18,387	23–11–2	48

January: 9–2–2 (home: 3–1–1; road: 6–1–1)
#	Date	Visitor	Score	Home	OT	Decision	Attendance	Record	Pts	Recap
37	January 1	Carolina	5–4	New Jersey	SO	Blackwood	16,514	23–11–3	49
38	January 4	New Jersey	5–1	Detroit		Vaněček	19,515	24–11–3	51
39	January 5	St. Louis	5–3	New Jersey		Schmid	15,561	24–12–3	51
40	January 7	NY Rangers	3–4	New Jersey	OT	Vaněček	16,514	25–12–3	53
41	January 10	New Jersey	5–3	Carolina		Vaněček	18,092	26–12–3	55
42	January 13	New Jersey	6–2	Anaheim		Vaněček	16,167	27–12–3	57
43	January 14	New Jersey	5–2	Los Angeles		Blackwood	18,230	28–12–3	59
44	January 16	New Jersey	4–3	San Jose	SO	Vaněček	13,293	29–12–3	61
45	January 19	New Jersey	3–4	Seattle	OT	Blackwood	17,151	29–12–4	62
46	January 22	Pittsburgh	1–2	New Jersey	OT	Vaněček	16,514	30–12–4	64
47	January 24	Vegas	2–3	New Jersey	OT	Vaněček	16,086	31–12–4	66
48	January 26	New Jersey	4–6	Nashville		Blackwood	17,164	31–13–4	66
49	January 27	New Jersey	3–2	Dallas	OT	Vaněček	18,532	32–13–4	68

February: 7–2–1 (home: 5–1–0; road: 2–1–1)
#	Date	Visitor	Score	Home	OT	Decision	Attendance	Record	Pts	Recap
50	February 6	Vancouver	4–5	New Jersey	OT	Vaněček	14,630	33–13–4	70
51	February 9	Seattle	1–3	New Jersey		Blackwood	15,697	34–13–4	72
52	February 11	New Jersey	2–3	Minnesota	SO	Vaněček	19,065	34–13–5	73
53	February 14	New Jersey	3–2	Columbus		Vaněček	15,840	35–13–5	75
54	February 16	New Jersey	2–4	St. Louis		Blackwood	18,096	35–14–5	75
55	February 18	New Jersey	5–2	Pittsburgh		Vaněček	18,427	36–14–5	77
56	February 19	Winnipeg	2–4	New Jersey		Blackwood	16,514	37–14–5	79
57	February 21	Montreal	5–2	New Jersey		Vaněček	14,854	37–15–5	79
58	February 23	Los Angeles	3–4	New Jersey	OT	Vaněček	15,397	38–15–5	81
59	February 25	Philadelphia	0–7	New Jersey		Schmid	16,514	39–15–5	83

March: 8–5–3 (home: 3–2–2; road: 5–3–1)
#	Date	Visitor	Score	Home	OT	Decision	Attendance	Record	Pts	Recap
60	March 1	New Jersey	7–5	Colorado		Vaněček	18,131	40–15–5	85
61	March 3	New Jersey	3–4	Vegas	SO	Schmid	18,033	40–15–6	86
62	March 5	New Jersey	5–4	Arizona	OT	Vaněček	4,600	41–15–6	88
63	March 7	Toronto	4–3	New Jersey		Vaněček	16,514	41–16–6	88
64	March 9	New Jersey	3–2	Washington	SO	Schmid	18,573	42–16–6	90
65	March 11	New Jersey	3–1	Montreal		Schmid	21,105	43–16–6	92
66	March 12	Carolina	0–3	New Jersey		Vaněček	16,514	44–16–6	94
67	March 14	Tampa Bay	4–1	New Jersey		Vaněček	15,622	44–17–6	94
68	March 16	Tampa Bay	4–3	New Jersey	SO	Schmid	16,094	44–17–7	95
69	March 18	New Jersey	2–4	Florida		Schmid	17,321	44–18–7	95
70	March 19	New Jersey	5–2	Tampa Bay		Vaněček	19,092	45–18–7	97
71	March 21	Minnesota	2–1	New Jersey	OT	Vaněček	16,124	45–18–8	98
72	March 24	New Jersey	4–5	Buffalo		Vaněček	17,101	45–19–8	98
73	March 25	Ottawa	3–5	New Jersey		Blackwood	16,514	46–19–8	100
74	March 27	New Jersey	1–5	NY Islanders		Vaněček	17,255	46–20–8	100
75	March 30	NY Rangers	1–2	New Jersey		Vaněček	16,669	47–20–8	102

April: 5–2–0 (home: 3–0–0; road: 2–2–0)
#	Date	Visitor	Score	Home	OT	Decision	Attendance	Record	Pts	Recap
76	April 1	New Jersey	6–3	Chicago		Blackwood	18,778	48–20–8	104
77	April 2	New Jersey	1–6	Winnipeg		Vaněček	14,107	48–21–8	104
78	April 4	Pittsburgh	1–5	New Jersey		Vaněček	16,514	49–21–8	106
79	April 6	Columbus	1–8	New Jersey		Vaněček	16,514	50–21–8	108
80	April 8	New Jersey	1–2	Boston		Blackwood	17,850	50–22–8	108
81	April 11	Buffalo	2–6	New Jersey		Vaněček	16,514	51–22–8	110
82	April 13	New Jersey	5–4	Washington	OT	Schmid	18,573	52–22–8	112

Legend: Win (2 points) Loss (0 points) Overtime/shootout loss (1 point)

=== Playoffs ===
The Devils faced the New York Rangers in the first round, and won the series in seven games. The Devils played the Carolina Hurricanes in the second round, losing the series in five games.

2023 Stanley Cup playoffs

Eastern Conference first round vs. (M3) New York Rangers: New Jersey won 4–3
#	Date	Visitor	Score	Home	OT	Decision	Attendance	Series	Recap
1	April 18	NY Rangers	5–1	New Jersey		Vaněček	16,514	0–1
2	April 20	NY Rangers	5–1	New Jersey		Vaněček	16,760	0–2
3	April 22	New Jersey	2–1	NY Rangers	OT	Schmid	18,006	1–2
4	April 24	New Jersey	3–1	NY Rangers		Schmid	18,006	2–2
5	April 27	NY Rangers	0–4	New Jersey		Schmid	17,114	3–2
6	April 29	New Jersey	2–5	NY Rangers		Schmid	18,006	3–3
7	May 1	NY Rangers	0–4	New Jersey		Schmid	17,241	4–3

Eastern Conference second round vs. (M1) Carolina Hurricanes: Carolina won 4–1
#	Date	Visitor	Score	Home	OT	Decision	Attendance	Series	Recap
1	May 3	New Jersey	1–5	Carolina		Schmid	18,735	0–1
2	May 5	New Jersey	1–6	Carolina		Schmid	18,982	0–2
3	May 7	Carolina	4–8	New Jersey		Vaněček	16,514	1–2
4	May 9	Carolina	6–1	New Jersey		Vaněček	17,016	1–3
5	May 11	New Jersey	2–3	Carolina	OT	Schmid	18,841	1–4

Legend: Win Loss

== Player statistics ==
As of May 11, 2023

=== Skaters ===
Regular season
Player	GP	G	A	Pts	+/−	PIM
Jack Hughes	78	43	56	99	+10	6
Nico Hischier	81	31	49	80	+33	10
Dougie Hamilton	82	22	52	74	+23	50
Jesper Bratt	82	32	41	73	+14	6
Dawson Mercer	82	27	29	56	+22	14
Tomáš Tatar	82	20	28	48	+41	30
Erik Haula	80	14	27	41	+13	47
Damon Severson	81	7	26	33	+9	38
Yegor Sharangovich	75	13	17	30	–3	16
Miles Wood	76	13	14	27	+1	76
Ryan Graves	78	8	18	26	+34	28
Michael McLeod	80	4	22	26	+6	43
Ondřej Palát	49	8	15	23	+5	6
Jesper Boqvist	70	10	11	21	+8	2
Jonas Siegenthaler	80	4	17	21	+27	44
Fabian Zetterlund^{‡}	45	6	14	20	+4	6
John Marino	64	4	14	18	+21	20
Nathan Bastian	43	6	9	15	+7	31
Timo Meier^{†}	21	9	5	14	0	18
Kevin Bahl	42	2	6	8	+4	35
Brendan Smith	60	0	5	5	+3	63
Alexander Holtz	19	3	1	4	–6	8
Luke Hughes	2	1	1	2	0	0
Nikita Okhotiuk^{‡}	10	1	0	1	+1	2
Nolan Foote	6	1	0	1	+2	0
Tyce Thompson	2	0	0	0	–1	0
Curtis Lazar^{†}	4	0	0	0	–1	7
Andreas Johnsson^{‡}	2	0	0	0	0	0

Playoffs
Player	GP	G	A	Pts	+/−	PIM
Jack Hughes	12	6	5	11	–4	2
Dawson Mercer	12	3	4	7	–1	2
[[Ondřej Palát {{{last}}}]]	12	3	4	7	–6	6
Nico Hischier	12	1	6	7	–5	2
Erik Haula	12	4	2	6	–6	15
Michael McLeod	12	4	2	6	+2	15
Jesper Bratt	12	1	5	6	–3	4
Timo Meier	11	2	2	4	–1	22
Dougie Hamilton	12	1	3	4	–11	2
John Marino	12	0	4	4	–1	0
Jonas Siegenthaler	11	1	2	3	–3	8
Damon Severson	12	1	2	3	–3	6
Miles Wood	8	2	0	2	0	14
Nathan Bastian	12	1	1	2	–1	16
Luke Hughes	3	0	2	2	–2	0
Curtis Lazar	6	1	0	1	0	2
Tomáš Tatar	12	1	0	1	–7	4
Kevin Bahl	11	0	1	1	–1	31
Ryan Graves	10	0	1	1	–1	4
Brendan Smith	3	0	1	1	+3	12
Yegor Sharangovich	3	0	0	0	–1	0
Jesper Boqvist	6	0	0	0	–2	0

=== Goaltenders ===
Regular season
Player	GP	GS	TOI	W	L	OT	GA	GAA	SA	SV%	SO	G	A	PIM
Vítek Vaněček	52	48	2,915:34	33	11	4	119	2.45	1,333	.911	3	0	3	2
Mackenzie Blackwood	22	20	1,125:33	10	6	2	60	3.20	563	.893	0	0	0	2
Akira Schmid	18	14	901:21	9	5	2	32	2.13	408	.922	1	0	0	0

Playoffs
Player	GP	GS	TOI	W	L	GA	GAA	SA	SV%	SO	G	A	PIM
Akira Schmid	9	8	459:46	4	4	18	2.35	229	.921	2	0	0	0
Vítek Vaněček	7	4	271:36	1	3	21	4.64	120	.825	0	0	1	0

- ^{†} Denotes player spent time with another team before joining the Devils. Stats reflect time with the Devils only.
- ^{‡} Denotes player was traded mid-season. Stats reflect time with the Devils only.
- Bold/italics denotes franchise record.

== Transactions ==
The Devils have been involved in the following transactions during the 2022–23 season.

=== Trades ===
Date	Details		Ref
July 8, 2022	To Washington Capitals 2nd-round pick in 2022; 3rd-round pick in 2022	To New Jersey Devils Vítek Vaněček; 2nd-round pick in 2022	
July 8, 2022	To Boston Bruins Pavel Zacha	To New Jersey Devils Erik Haula	
July 16, 2022	To Pittsburgh Penguins Ty Smith; 3rd-round pick in 2023	To New Jersey Devils John Marino	
February 26, 2023	To San Jose Sharks Andreas Johnsson; Shakir Mukhamadullin; Nikita Okhotiuk; Fabian Zetterlund; Conditional 1st-round pick in 2023; Conditional 2nd-round pick in 2024; 7th-round pick in 2024	To New Jersey Devils Zachary Émond; Scott Harrington; Santeri Hatakka; Timur Ibragimov; Timo Meier; COL's 5th-round pick in 2024	
March 3, 2023	To Vancouver Canucks 4th-round pick in 2024	To New Jersey Devils Curtis Lazar	
March 10, 2023	To Carolina Hurricanes Jack Dugan	To New Jersey Devils Zack Hayes	
March 10, 2023	To Ottawa Senators Future considerations	To New Jersey Devils Jayce Hawryluk	
June 9, 2023	To Columbus Blue Jackets Damon Severson	To New Jersey Devils 3rd-round pick in 2023	
June 26, 2023	To Boston Bruins Reilly Walsh	To New Jersey Devils Shane Bowers	
June 27, 2023	To Calgary Flames Yegor Sharangovich; 3rd-round pick in 2023	To New Jersey Devils Tyler Toffoli	
June 27, 2023	To San Jose Sharks Mackenzie Blackwood	To New Jersey Devils 6th-round pick in 2023	

=== Free agents ===
Date	Player	Team	Contract term	Ref
July 13, 2022	Jon Gillies	to Arizona Coyotes	1-year	
July 13, 2022	A. J. Greer	to Boston Bruins	2-year	
July 13, 2022	Brendan Smith	from Carolina Hurricanes	2-year	
July 14, 2022	Chase De Leo	to Anaheim Ducks	2-year	
July 14, 2022	Ondřej Palát	from Tampa Bay Lightning	5-year	
July 14, 2022	Colton White	to Anaheim Ducks	2-year	
July 15, 2022	Jack Dugan	from Vegas Golden Knights (Note: Was under contract with the Golden Knights, but played for their AHL affiliate during the 2021–22 season.)	1-year	
July 15, 2022	Brian Pinho	from Washington Capitals (Note: Was under contract with the Capitals, but played for their AHL affiliate during the 2021–22 season.)	1-year	
July 15, 2022	Tyler Wotherspoon	from Utica Comets (AHL)	2-year	
August 2, 2022	Frédérik Gauthier	to HC Ajoie (NL)	1-year	
September 16, 2022	Andrew Hammond	to Traktor Chelyabinsk (KHL)	1-year	
October 9, 2022	Jimmy Vesey	to New York Rangers	1-year	
May 16, 2023	Timur Ibragimov	to Utica Comets (AHL)	1-year	
May 19, 2023	Joe Gambardella	to Utica Comets (AHL)	2-year	
May 19, 2023	Robbie Russo	to Utica Comets (AHL)	1-year	
May 23, 2023	Aarne Talvitie	to HC TPS (Liiga)	2-year	

=== Waivers ===
Date	Player	Team	Ref
February 28, 2023	Scott Harrington	to Anaheim Ducks	

=== Contract terminations ===
Date	Player	Via	Ref
July 13, 2022	Janne Kuokkanen	Buyout	

=== Retirement ===
Date	Player	Ref
September 20, 2022	P. K. Subban	

=== Signings ===
Date	Player	Contract term	Ref
July 14, 2021	Šimon Nemec	3-year	
July 15, 2022	Mason Geertsen	1-year	
July 19, 2022	Vítek Vaněček	3-year	
July 22, 2022	Jesper Boqvist	1-year	
July 26, 2022	Jonas Siegenthaler	5-year	
August 2, 2022	Tyce Thompson	2-year	
August 3, 2022	Jesper Bratt	1-year	
August 4, 2022	Miles Wood	1-year	
August 10, 2022	Fabian Zetterlund	1-year	
March 31, 2023	Josh Filmon	3-year	
April 8, 2023	Luke Hughes	3-year	
April 16, 2023	Tyler Brennan	3-year	
May 4, 2023	Daniil Misyul	2-year	
June 15, 2023	Jesper Bratt	8-year	
June 23, 2023	Erik Haula	3-year	

== Draft picks ==
Below are the New Jersey Devils' selections at the 2022 NHL entry draft, which was held on July 7 and 8, 2022, at Bell Centre in Montreal.

Round	#	Player	Pos	Nationality	College/junior/club team
1	2	Šimon Nemec	D	Slovakia	HK Nitra (Tipos Extraliga)
2	46^{1}	Seamus Casey	D	United States	U.S. NTDP (USHL)
4	102	Tyler Brennan	G	Canada	Prince George Cougars (WHL)
4	110^{2}	Daniil Orlov	D	Russia	Sakhalinskiye Akuly (MHL)
4	126^{3}	Charlie Leddy	D	United States	U.S. NTDP (USHL)
5	141^{4}	Petr Hauser	RW	Czech Republic	HC Sparta Praha U20 (Czech U20)
6	166	Josh Filmon	LW	Canada	Swift Current Broncos (WHL)
7	198	Artyom Barabosha	D	Russia	Krasnaya Armiya (MHL)

1. The Washington Capitals' second-round pick went to the New Jersey Devils as the result of a trade on July 8, 2022, that sent second-round and third-round picks in 2022 to Washington in exchange for Vítek Vaněček and this pick.
2. The New York Islanders' fourth-round pick went to the New Jersey Devils as the result of a trade on April 7, 2021, that sent Kyle Palmieri and Travis Zajac to New York in exchange for A. J. Greer, Mason Jobst, a conditional 2022 fourth-round pick and this pick.
3. The Edmonton Oilers' fourth-round pick went to the New Jersey Devils as the result of a trade on April 12, 2021, that sent Dmitry Kulikov to Edmonton in exchange for this pick (being conditional at the time of the trade).
4. The Columbus Blue Jackets' fifth-round pick went to the New Jersey Devils as the result of a trade on February 25, 2019, that sent Keith Kinkaid to Columbus in exchange for this pick.
