= Filip Nordberg =

Swedish ice hockey player (born 2004)

- Born: March 5, 2004 (age 22) Stockholm, Sweden
- Height: 195 cm (6 ft 5 in)
- Weight: 98 kg (216 lb; 15 st 6 lb)
- Position: Defence
- Shoots: Left
- NHL team (P) Cur. team Former teams: Ottawa Senators; Arizona State (NCAA): Merrimack Warriors (NCAA); Sioux Falls Stampede (USHL); Muskegon Lumberjacks (USHL); Växjö Lakers (SHL)
- NHL draft: 64th overall, 2022; Ottawa Senators
- Playing career: 2023–present

Filip Nordberg (born March 5, 2004) is a Swedish ice hockey defenceman currently playing for Arizona State University of the National Collegiate Hockey Conference (NCHC). Nordberg was selected by the Ottawa Senators of the National Hockey League (NHL) in the second round, 64th overall, of the 2022 NHL entry draft. Nordberg made his SHL debut during the 2022–23 SHL season.

== Playing career ==
Nordberg played nine games in 2022-23 with Växjö Lakers of the SHL, while also playing for their under-20 team. In 2023, he moved to North America to play for Muskegon Lumberjacks of the USHL junior league. After a season with Muskegon, he transferred to Sioux Falls Stampede also of the USHL.

In 2025, Nordberg joined Merrimack College which plays in the Hockey East conference of the National Collegiate Athletic Association (NCAA). He is the highest-drafted NHL prospect to play for Merrimack. In his one season with Merrimack he recorded seven assists and led freshmen with 48 blocked shots. In 2026, Nordberg transferred to Arizona State University which plays in the National Collegiate Hockey Conference (NCHC) of the NCAA's Division I.

=== International play ===
Nordberg has represented Sweden in two IIHF World Junior Championships - 2022 and 2023.
