= Wyatt Kalynuk =

Canadian ice hockey player

- Born: April 14, 1997 (age 29) Brandon, Manitoba, Canada
- Height: 6 ft 1 in (185 cm)
- Weight: 180 lb (82 kg; 12 st 12 lb)
- Position: Defence
- Shoots: Left
- KHL team Former teams: Shanghai Dragons; Chicago Blackhawks; Lahti Pelicans; Ak Bars Kazan; Salavat Yulaev Ufa
- NHL draft: 196th overall, 2017; Philadelphia Flyers
- Playing career: 2020–present

Wyatt Kalynuk (born April 14, 1997) is a Canadian professional ice hockey defenseman for Shanghai Dragons of the Kontinental Hockey League (KHL). He was selected in the seventh round, 196th overall, by the Philadelphia Flyers in the 2017 NHL entry draft. He previously played for the Wisconsin Badgers in the NCAA.

== Early life ==
Kalynuk was born on April 14, 1997, in Brandon, Manitoba, and was raised in nearby Virden by parents Leanne and Randy Kalynuk. He began playing minor ice hockey with the Virden Minor Hockey Association, and would practice for hours per day at an outdoor rink outside Virden Junior High School. Kalynuk says that, while many of his youth hockey teammates aspired to play in the National Hockey League (NHL), he "was just thinking about playing the game for fun". His minor hockey career continued with the Southwest Cougars of the Manitoba U-18 'AAA' Hockey League. In one season with the U18 AAA Cougars, Kalynuk scored one goal and 17 points in 43 games.

== Playing career ==
=== Amateur ===
Kalynuk was given an opportunity to begin playing for the Western Hockey League when he turned 16, but he was physically smaller than most of the other players, so he decided to spend one season playing junior ice hockey in Manitoba. He spent the 2013–14 hockey season with the Virden Oil Capitals of the Manitoba Junior Hockey League (MJHL). He was the youngest member on the team that year, playing on a defensive pair with Brad Reichardt. Kalynuk scored seven points in his first 25 games as a member of the Oil Capitals, and scored his first junior hockey goal on November 23, 2013, in a 7–0 victory over the OCN Blizzard. At the conclusion of the season, Kalynuk was named to the MJHL's All-Rookie Team.

=== Professional ===
Kalynuk made his NHL debut on March 7, 2021, in a 6–3 loss against the Tampa Bay Lightning. His first NHL goal also happened to be the game-winning goal, coming late in the second period of a 4–3 victory against the Columbus Blue Jackets on April 10.

As an impending restricted free agent following the 2021–22 season, Kalynuk was not tendered a qualifying offer by the rebuilding Blackhawks, and was released to free agency on 12 July 2022. The following day Kalynuk was signed to a one-year, two-way contract to join the Vancouver Canucks. He was traded to the New York Rangers in exchange for future considerations on March 3, 2023.

On July 1, 2023, Kalynuk as a free agent from the Rangers was signed to a one-year, two-way contract with the St. Louis Blues.

After four professional seasons in North America, Kalynuk opted to pursue a career abroad in agreeing to an initial one-year contract with Finnish club, Lahti Pelicans of the Liiga, on August 8, 2024. In the 2024–25 season, Kalynuk led the offense from the blueline for the Pelicans, posting 10 goals and 33 points in 59 appearances.

At the conclusion of his contract, Kalynuk left as a free agent to sign a one-year contract with Russian club, Ak Bars Kazan of the KHL, for the 2025–26 season on July 2, 2025.

== Career statistics ==
=== Regular season and playoffs ===
			Regular season					Playoffs
Season	Team	League	GP	G	A	Pts	PIM	GP	G	A	Pts	PIM
2013–14	Virden Oil Capitals	MJHL	56	1	12	13	8	10	1	2	3	6
2014–15	Lincoln Stars	USHL	55	0	15	15	16	—	—	—	—	—
2015–16	Bloomington Thunder	USHL	59	3	21	24	16	10	0	2	2	8
2016–17	Bloomington Thunder	USHL	60	6	25	31	82	—	—	—	—	—
2017–18	U. of Wisconsin	B1G	37	3	22	25	28	—	—	—	—	—
2018–19	U. of Wisconsin	B1G	37	9	16	25	32	—	—	—	—	—
2019–20	U. of Wisconsin	B1G	36	7	21	28	24	—	—	—	—	—
2020–21	Rockford IceHogs	AHL	8	2	8	10	6	—	—	—	—	—
2020–21	Chicago Blackhawks	NHL	21	4	5	9	4	—	—	—	—	—
2021–22	Rockford IceHogs	AHL	52	7	20	27	55	5	0	1	1	6
2021–22	Chicago Blackhawks	NHL	5	0	0	0	2	—	—	—	—	—
2022–23	Abbotsford Canucks	AHL	46	4	13	17	46	—	—	—	—	—
2022–23	Hartford Wolf Pack	AHL	15	0	2	2	40	9	1	2	3	6
2023–24	Springfield Thunderbirds	AHL	66	5	13	18	65	—	—	—	—	—
2024–25	Lahti Pelicans	Liiga	59	10	23	33	30	—	—	—	—	—
2025–26	Ak Bars Kazan	KHL	2	0	0	0	2	—	—	—	—	—
2025–26	Salavat Yulaev Ufa	KHL	18	1	4	5	0	—	—	—	—	—
2025–26	Shanghai Dragons	KHL	18	1	3	4	22	—	—	—	—	—
NHL totals			26	4	5	9	6	—	—	—	—	—

=== International ===
Year	Team	Event	Result	GP	G	A	Pts	PIM
2014	Canada Western	U17	9th	5	0	0	0	0
Junior totals				5	0	0	0	0

== Awards and honours ==
Award	Year
MJHL
All-Rookie Team	2014
USHL
Third All-Star Team	2017
College
B1G All-Rookie Team	2018
B1G Honorable Mention All-Star Team	2018
B1G Second All-Star Team	2019
B1G First All-Star Team	2020
B1G Sportsmanship Award	2020
