= 2022–23 Los Angeles Kings season =

Professional ice hockey team season of play

2022–23 Los Angeles Kings
- Division: 3rd Pacific
- Conference: 5th Western
- 2022–23 record: 47–25–10
- Home record: 26–11–4
- Road record: 21–14–6
- Goals for: 280
- Goals against: 257

Team information
- General manager: Rob Blake
- Coach: Todd McLellan
- Captain: Anze Kopitar
- Alternate captains: Phillip Danault; Drew Doughty
- Arena: Crypto.com Arena
- Average attendance: 17,067
- Minor league affiliates: Ontario Reign (AHL); Greenville Swamp Rabbits (ECHL)

Team leaders
- Goals: Adrian Kempe (41)
- Assists: Kevin Fiala (49)
- Points: Anze Kopitar (74)
- Penalty minutes: Blake Lizotte (70)
- Plus/minus: Adrian Kempe (+22)
- Wins: Pheonix Copley (24)
- Goals against average: Joonas Korpisalo (2.13)

The 2022–23 Los Angeles Kings season was the 56th season (55th season of play) for the National Hockey League (NHL) franchise that was established on June 5, 1967.

This was the first season without longtime winger Dustin Brown on the roster as he announced his retirement on April 28, 2022, following the 2022 Stanley Cup playoffs. This season was also their last with longtime goaltender and Conn Smythe Trophy winner Jonathan Quick, who was shockingly traded on March 1, 2023, to the Columbus Blue Jackets; the Blue Jackets traded Quick to the Vegas Golden Knights the following day. The Kings qualified for the playoffs on April 2, 2023, after a win over the Vancouver Canucks. However, in the playoffs, the Edmonton Oilers would defeat the Kings for the second year in a row, in six games.

== Standings ==
=== Divisional standings ===
Pacific Division
Pos	Team	GP	W	L	OTL	RW	GF	GA	GD	Pts
1	z – Vegas Golden Knights	82	51	22	9	38	272	229	+43	111
2	x – Edmonton Oilers	82	50	23	9	45	325	260	+65	109
3	x – Los Angeles Kings	82	47	25	10	37	280	257	+23	104
4	x – Seattle Kraken	82	46	28	8	37	289	256	+33	100
5	Calgary Flames	82	38	27	17	31	260	252	+8	93
6	Vancouver Canucks	82	38	37	7	24	276	298	−22	83
7	San Jose Sharks	82	22	44	16	16	234	321	−87	60
8	Anaheim Ducks	82	23	47	12	13	209	338	−129	58

Source: National Hockey League
Rules for classification: 1) Fewer number of games played (GP, only during regular season); 2) Greater number of regulation wins (RW); 3) Greater number of wins in regulation and overtime, excluding shootout wins (ROW); 4) Greater number of total wins, including shootouts (W); 5) Greater number of points earned in head-to-head play; if teams played an uneven number of head-to-head games, the result of the first game on the home ice of the team with the extra home game is discarded; 6) Greater goal differential (GD); 7) Greater number of goals scored (GF)
x – Clinched playoff spot; z – Clinched conference

=== Conference standings ===
Western Conference Wild Card
Pos	Div	Team	GP	W	L	OTL	RW	GF	GA	GD	Pts
1	PA	x – Seattle Kraken	82	46	28	8	37	289	256	+33	100
2	CE	x – Winnipeg Jets	82	46	33	3	36	247	225	+22	95
3	PA	Calgary Flames	82	38	27	17	31	260	252	+8	93
4	CE	Nashville Predators	82	42	32	8	29	229	238	−9	92
5	PA	Vancouver Canucks	82	38	37	7	24	276	298	−22	83
6	CE	St. Louis Blues	82	37	38	7	27	263	301	−38	81
7	CE	Arizona Coyotes	82	28	40	14	20	228	299	−71	70
8	PA	San Jose Sharks	82	22	44	16	16	234	321	−87	60
9	CE	Chicago Blackhawks	82	26	49	7	18	204	301	−97	59
10	PA	Anaheim Ducks	82	23	47	12	13	209	338	−129	58

Source: National Hockey League
Rules for classification: 1) Fewer number of games played (GP, only during regular season); 2) Greater number of regulation wins (RW); 3) Greater number of wins in regulation and overtime, excluding shootout wins (ROW); 4) Greater number of total wins, including shootouts (W); 5) Greater number of points earned in head-to-head play; if teams played an uneven number of head-to-head games, the result of the first game on the home ice of the team with the extra home game is discarded; 6) Greater goal differential (GD); 7) Greater number of goals scored (GF)
x – Clinched playoff spot

== Schedule and results ==
=== Preseason ===
The preseason schedule was published on July 5, 2022.

2022 preseason: 3–3–1 (home: 2–2–0; road: 1–1–1)

Game	Date	Opponent	Score	OT	Decision	Location	Attendance	Record	Recap
1	September 25	@ San Jose	2–3	OT	Villalta	SAP Center	9,042	0–0–1	
2	September 26	@ Vegas	2–1	OT	Copley	T-Mobile Arena	17,026	1–0–1	
3	September 28	San Jose	1–3		Villalta	Toyota Arena		1–1–1	
4	October 2	Anaheim	2–1		Quick	Crypto.com Arena	12,031	2–1–1	
5	October 4	@ Anaheim	4–5		Petersen	Honda Center	12,968	2–2–1	
6	October 6	Vegas	4–6		Petersen	Vivint Arena		2–3–1	
7	October 8	Anaheim	6–3		Quick	Crypto.com Arena	12,845	3–3–1	

=== Regular season ===
The regular season schedule was released on July 6, 2022,

2022–23 game log
October: 6–5–0 (home: 2–3–0; road: 4–2–0)

Game	Date	Opponent	Score	OT	Decision	Location	Attendance	Record	Points	Recap
1	October 11	Vegas Golden Knights	3–4		Quick	Crypto.com Arena	18,230	0–1–0	0	
2	October 13	Seattle Kraken	1–4		Quick	Crypto.com Arena	15,645	0–2–0	0	
3	October 15	@ Minnesota Wild	7–6		Petersen	Xcel Energy Center	18,421	1–2–0	2	
4	October 17	@ Detroit Red Wings	5–4	OT	Quick	Little Caesars Arena	15,919	2–2–0	4	
5	October 18	@ Nashville Predators	4–3	SO	Petersen	Bridgestone Arena	17,159	3–2–0	6	
6	October 20	@ Pittsburgh Penguins	1–6		Petersen	PPG Paints Arena	17,136	3–3–0	6	
7	October 22	@ Washington Capitals	3–4		Quick	Capital One Arena	18,573	3–4–0	6	
8	October 25	Tampa Bay Lightning	4–2		Quick	Crypto.com Arena	16,480	4–4–0	8	
9	October 27	Winnipeg Jets	4–6		Quick	Crypto.com Arena	15,716	4–5–0	8	
10	October 29	Toronto Maple Leafs	4–2		Petersen	Crypto.com Arena	17,530	5–5–0	10	
11	October 31	@ St. Louis Blues	5–1		Quick	Enterprise Center	17,220	6–5–0	12	

November: 6–4–4 (home: 4–1–2; road: 2–3–2)

Game	Date	Opponent	Score	OT	Decision	Location	Attendance	Record	Points	Recap
12	November 1	@ Dallas Stars	2–5		Petersen	American Airlines Center	18,374	6–6–0	12	
13	November 3	@ Chicago Blackhawks	1–2	OT	Quick	United Center	16,658	6–6–1	13	
14	November 5	Florida Panthers	5–4		Quick	Crypto.com Arena	16,161	7–6–1	15	
15	November 8	Minnesota Wild	1–0		Quick	Crypto.com Arena	13,558	8–6–1	17	
16	November 10	Chicago Blackhawks	2–1	OT	Quick	Crypto.com Arena	16,443	9–6–1	19	
17	November 12	Detroit Red Wings	4–3		Petersen	Crypto.com Arena	18,230	10–6–1	21	
18	November 14	@ Calgary Flames	5–6		Quick	Scotiabank Saddledome	17,308	10–7–1	21	
19	November 16	@ Edmonton Oilers	3–1		Petersen	Rogers Place	16,943	11–7–1	23	
20	November 18	@ Vancouver Canucks	1–4		Quick	Rogers Arena	18,841	11–8–1	23	
21	November 19	@ Seattle Kraken	2–3	OT	Petersen	Climate Pledge Arena	17,151	11–8–2	24	
22	November 22	New York Rangers	3–5		Petersen	Crypto.com Arena	18,230	11–9–2	24	
23	November 25	@ San Jose Sharks	5–2		Quick	SAP Center	17,562	12–9–2	26	
24	November 27	Ottawa Senators	2–3	OT	Quick	Crypto.com Arena	15,136	12–9–3	27	
25	November 29	Seattle Kraken	8–9	OT	Petersen	Crypto.com Arena	13,215	12–9–4	28	

December: 9–4–2 (home: 5–2–0; road: 4–2–2)

Game	Date	Opponent	Score	OT	Decision	Location	Attendance	Record	Points	Recap
26	December 1	Arizona Coyotes	5–3		Quick	Crypto.com Arena	13,764	13–9–4	30	
27	December 3	Carolina Hurricanes	2–4		Quick	Crypto.com Arena	16,067	13–10–4	30	
28	December 6	@ Ottawa Senators	5–2		Copley	Canadian Tire Centre	13,459	14–10–4	32	
29	December 8	@ Toronto Maple Leafs	0–5		Quick	Scotiabank Arena	18,567	14–11–4	32	
30	December 10	@ Montreal Canadiens	4–2		Copley	Bell Centre	21,105	15–11–4	34	
31	December 11	@ Columbus Blue Jackets	5–6	OT	Quick	Nationwide Arena	14,560	15–11–5	35	
32	December 13	@ Buffalo Sabres	0–6		Copley	KeyBank Center	12,873	15–12–5	35	
33	December 15	@ Boston Bruins	3–2	SO	Copley	TD Garden	17,850	16–12–5	37	
34	December 17	San Jose Sharks	3–2	SO	Copley	Crypto.com Arena	18,230	17–12–5	39	
35	December 20	Anaheim Ducks	4–1		Copley	Crypto.com Arena	18,230	18–12–5	41	
36	December 22	Calgary Flames	4–3	OT	Copley	Crypto.com Arena	16,731	19–12–5	43	
37	December 23	@ Arizona Coyotes	1–2	SO	Quick	Mullett Arena	4,600	19–12–6	44	
38	December 27	Vegas Golden Knights	4–2		Copley	Crypto.com Arena	18,230	20–12–6	46	
39	December 29	@ Colorado Avalanche	5–4	SO	Copley	Ball Arena	18,132	21–12–6	48	
40	December 31	Philadelphia Flyers	2–4		Quick	Crypto.com Arena	18,230	21–13–6	48	

January: 7–5–1 (home: 3–3–0; road: 4–2–1)

Game	Date	Opponent	Score	OT	Decision	Location	Attendance	Record	Points	Recap
41	January 3	Dallas Stars	3–2		Copley	Crypto.com Arena	16,498	22–13–6	50	
42	January 5	Boston Bruins	2–5		Copley	Crypto.com Arena	18,230	22–14–6	50	
43	January 7	@ Vegas Golden Knights	5–1		Copley	T-Mobile Arena	18,339	23–14–6	52	
44	January 9	Edmonton Oilers	6–3		Copley	Crypto.com Arena	16,039	24–14–6	54	
45	January 11	San Jose Sharks	4–3		Copley	Crypto.com Arena	16,717	25–14–6	56	
46	January 14	New Jersey Devils	2–5		Quick	Crypto.com Arena	18,230	25–15–6	56	
47	January 19	Dallas Stars	0–4		Copley	Crypto.com Arena	18,230	25–16–6	56	
48	January 21	@ Nashville Predators	3–5		Quick	Bridgestone Arena	17,654	25–17–6	56	
49	January 22	@ Chicago Blackhawks	2–1		Copley	United Center	19,236	26–17–6	58	
50	January 24	@ Philadelphia Flyers	4–3	OT	Copley	Wells Fargo Center	15,602	27–17–6	60	
51	January 27	@ Florida Panthers	4–3		Copley	FLA Live Arena	15,322	28–17–6	62	
52	January 28	@ Tampa Bay Lightning	2–5		Quick	Amalie Arena	19,092	28–18–6	62	
53	January 31	@ Carolina Hurricanes	4–5	OT	Copley	PNC Arena	18,443	28–18–7	63	

February: 6–2–1 (home: 3–0–0; road: 3–2–1)

Game	Date	Opponent	Score	OT	Decision	Location	Attendance	Record	Points	Recap
54	February 11	Pittsburgh Penguins	6–0		Copley	Crypto.com Arena	18,230	29–18–7	65	
55	February 13	Buffalo Sabres	5–2		Copley	Crypto.com Arena	17,025	30–18–7	67	
56	February 17	@ Anaheim Ducks	6–3		Quick	Honda Center	17,272	31–18–7	69	
57	February 18	Arizona Coyotes	6–5	SO	Quick	Crypto.com Arena	18,230	32–18–7	71	
58	February 21	@ Minnesota Wild	1–2		Copley	Xcel Energy Center	18,012	32–19–7	71	
59	February 23	@ New Jersey Devils	3–4	OT	Copley	Prudential Center	15,397	32–19–8	72	
60	February 24	@ New York Islanders	3–2		Quick	UBS Arena	17,255	33–19–8	74	
61	February 26	@ New York Rangers	2–5		Quick	Madison Square Garden	18,006	33–20–8	74	
62	February 28	@ Winnipeg Jets	6–5	SO	Copley	Canada Life Centre	13,203	34–20–8	76	

March: 9–2–2 (home: 7–0–2; road: 1–2–0)

Game	Date	Opponent	Score	OT	Decision	Location	Attendance	Record	Points	Recap
63	March 2	Montreal Canadiens	3–2		Copley	Crypto.com Arena	16,974	35–20–8	78	
64	March 4	St. Louis Blues	4–2		Korpisalo	Crypto.com Arena	18,230	36–20–8	80	
65	March 6	Washington Capitals	4–2		Copley	Crypto.com Arena	17,577	37–20–8	82	
66	March 9	@ Colorado Avalanche	5–2		Korpisalo	Ball Arena	18,117	38–20–8	84	
67	March 11	Nashville Predators	1–2	SO	Copley	Crypto.com Arena	18,230	38–20–9	85	
68	March 14	New York Islanders	5–2		Korpisalo	Crypto.com Arena	15,989	39–20–9	87	
69	March 16	Columbus Blue Jackets	4–1		Copley	Crypto.com Arena	15,460	40–20–9	89	
70	March 18	Vancouver Canucks	2–3	SO	Korpisalo	Crypto.com Arena	18,230	40–20–10	90	
71	March 20	Calgary Flames	8–2		Copley	Crypto.com Arena	16,404	41–20–10	92	
72	March 25	Winnipeg Jets	4–1		Korpisalo	Crypto.com Arena	18,230	42–20–10	94	
73	March 26	St. Louis Blues	7–6		Copley	Crypto.com Arena	18,230	43–20–10	96	
74	March 28	@ Calgary Flames	1–2		Korpisalo	Scotiabank Saddledome	17,106	43–21–10	96	
75	March 30	@ Edmonton Oilers	0–2		Korpisalo	Rogers Place	18,347	43–22–10	96	

April: 4–3–0 (home: 1–2–0; road: 3–1–0)

Game	Date	Opponent	Score	OT	Decision	Location	Attendance	Record	Points	Recap
76	April 1	@ Seattle Kraken	3–1		Copley	Climate Pledge Arena	17,151	44–22–10	98	
77	April 2	@ Vancouver Canucks	4–1		Korpisalo	Rogers Arena	18,725	45–22–10	100	
78	April 4	Edmonton Oilers	1–3		Copley	Crypto.com Arena	18,230	45–23–10	100	
79	April 6	@ Vegas Golden Knights	2–5		Korpisalo	T-Mobile Arena	18,404	45–24–10	100	
80	April 8	Colorado Avalanche	3–4		Copley	Crypto.com Arena	18,230	45–25–10	100	
81	April 10	Vancouver Canucks	3–0		Korpisalo	Crypto.com Arena	18,230	46–25–10	102	
82	April 13	@ Anaheim Ducks	5–3		Korpisalo	Honda Center	17,174	47–25–10	104	

Legend:

Win (2 points) Loss (0 points) OT/SO loss (1 point)

=== Playoffs ===
2023 Stanley Cup playoffs

Western Conference First Round vs. (P2) Edmonton Oilers: Edmonton won 4–2
#	Date	Visitor	Score	Home	OT	Decision	Attendance	Series	Recap
1	April 17	Los Angeles	4–3	Edmonton	OT	Korpisalo	18,347	1–0
2	April 19	Los Angeles	2–4	Edmonton		Korpisalo	18,347	1–1
3	April 21	Edmonton	2–3	Los Angeles	OT	Korpisalo	18,230	2–1
4	April 23	Edmonton	5–4	Los Angeles	OT	Korpisalo	18,367	2–2
5	April 25	Los Angeles	3–6	Edmonton		Korpisalo	18,347	2–3
6	April 29	Edmonton	5–4	Los Angeles		Korpisalo	18,230	2–4

Legend: Win Loss

== Player statistics ==
Final stats

=== Skaters ===
Regular season
Player	GP	G	A	Pts	+/–	PIM
Anze Kopitar	82	28	46	74	+20	4
Kevin Fiala	69	23	49	72	+2	52
Adrian Kempe	82	41	26	67	+22	55
Viktor Arvidsson	77	26	33	59	–4	24
Phillip Danault	82	18	36	54	–8	63
Drew Doughty	81	9	43	52	+12	34
Gabriel Vilardi	63	23	18	41	+10	18
Sean Durzi	72	9	29	38	–12	50
Alex Iafallo	59	14	22	36	+14	20
Blake Lizotte	81	11	23	34	+11	70
Trevor Moore	59	10	19	29	–2	14
Arthur Kaliyev	56	13	15	28	–5	12
Matt Roy	82	9	17	26	+8	22
Quinton Byfield	53	3	19	22	+13	30
Mikey Anderson	77	5	15	20	+20	40
Carl Grundstrom	57	12	7	19	–4	16
Rasmus Kupari	66	3	12	15	–5	12
Sean Walker	70	3	10	13	–3	36
Jaret Anderson-Dolan	46	7	5	12	–11	2
Alexander Edler	64	2	9	11	–1	34
Vladislav Gavrikov^{†}	20	3	6	9	+12	8
Samuel Fagemo	9	2	1	3	–4	0
Brendan Lemieux^{‡}	27	0	3	3	–6	53
Brandt Clarke	9	0	2	2	–1	6
Zack MacEwen^{†}	10	0	1	1	–2	12
Tobias Bjornfot	10	0	1	1	+1	6
Jordan Spence	6	0	1	1	+1	0
Jacob Moverare	2	0	0	0	–1	0
Lias Andersson	1	0	0	0	–1	0
Alex Turcotte	4	0	0	0	–2	5

Playoffs
Player	GP	G	A	Pts	+/−	PIM
Adrian Kempe	6	5	3	8	–3	2
Anze Kopitar	6	2	5	7	–3	0
Viktor Arvidsson	6	1	6	7	–2	2
Kevin Fiala	3	1	5	6	+1	4
Phillip Danault	6	2	3	5	+1	12
Alex Iafallo	6	3	1	4	+2	6
Gabriel Vilardi	5	2	2	4	0	0
Quinton Byfield	6	1	3	4	–5	2
Matt Roy	6	1	2	3	+4	0
Trevor Moore	6	1	2	3	+3	0
Drew Doughty	6	0	3	3	–5	4
Sean Durzi	6	1	0	1	–4	2
Vladislav Gavrikov^{†}	6	0	1	1	+5	0
Carl Grundstrom	6	0	1	1	–3	4
Mikey Anderson	6	0	1	1	–4	2
Alexander Edler	4	0	0	0	–1	4
Zack MacEwen^{†}	1	0	0	0	0	2
Jaret Anderson-Dolan	4	0	0	0	0	0
Sean Walker	2	0	0	0	–1	0
Rasmus Kupari	6	0	0	0	–2	0
Blake Lizotte	3	0	0	0	0	2
Arthur Kaliyev	2	0	0	0	–1	0

=== Goaltenders ===
Regular season
Player	GP	GS	TOI	W	L	OT	GA	GAA	SA	SV%	SO	G	A	PIM
Pheonix Copley	37	35	2,089:29	24	6	3	92	2.64	947	.903	1	0	1	19
Jonathan Quick	31	27	1,698:23	11	13	4	99	3.50	798	.876	1	0	0	2
Joonas Korpisalo^{†}	11	11	621:00	7	3	1	22	2.13	280	.921	1	0	0	0
Cal Petersen	10	9	543:28	5	3	2	34	3.75	257	.868	0	0	0	0

Playoffs
Player	GP	GS	TOI	W	L	GA	GAA	SA	SV%	SO	G	A	PIM
Joonas Korpisalo^{†}	6	6	350:15	2	4	22	3.77	203	.892	0	0	0	0
Pheonix Copley	1	0	28:11	0	0	2	4.26	8	.750	0	0	0	0

^{†}Denotes player spent time with another team before joining the Kings. Stats reflect time with the Kings only.
^{‡}Denotes player was traded mid-season. Stats reflect time with the Kings only.
Bold/italics denotes franchise record.

== Transactions ==
The Kings have been involved in the following transactions during the 2022–23 season.

Key:

† Contract is entry-level.
‡ Contract initially takes effect in the 2023–24 NHL season.

=== Trades ===
Date	Details		Ref
July 8, 2022	To Tampa Bay Lightning PIT 3rd-round pick in 2022	To Los Angeles Kings CHI 4th-round pick in 2022; DET 6th-round pick in 2022	
July 8, 2022	To Boston Bruins 7th-round pick in 2023	To Los Angeles Kings 7th-round pick in 2022	
March 1, 2023	To Buffalo Sabres 3rd-round pick in 2023	To Los Angeles Kings Erik Portillo	
March 1, 2023	To Columbus Blue Jackets Jonathan Quick; Conditional^{1} 1st-round pick in 2023; 3rd-round pick in 2024	To Los Angeles Kings Vladislav Gavrikov; Joonas Korpisalo	
March 2, 2023	To Philadelphia Flyers Brendan Lemieux; 5th-round pick in 2024	To Los Angeles Kings Zack MacEwen	
March 3, 2023	To Chicago Blackhawks Austin Wagner	To Los Angeles Kings Future considerations	
March 3, 2023	To Montreal Canadiens Nate Schnarr	To Los Angeles Kings Frederic Allard	
March 20, 2023	To Florida Panthers Future considerations	To Los Angeles Kings Cole Krygier	
June 6, 2023	To Columbus Blue Jackets Ivan Provorov^{2}	To Los Angeles Kings Kevin Connauton; Hayden Hodgson	
June 6, 2023	To Philadelphia Flyers Helge Grans; Cal Petersen; Sean Walker; 1st-round pick in 2023; 2nd-round pick in 2024; Conditional CBJ 2nd-round pick in 2024 or 2025	To Los Angeles Kings Kevin Connauton; Hayden Hodgson	
June 24, 2023	To Arizona Coyotes Sean Durzi	To Los Angeles Kings MTL 2nd-round pick in 2024	
June 27, 2023	To Winnipeg Jets Alex Iafallo; Rasmus Kupari; Gabriel Vilardi; MTL 2nd-round pick in 2024	To Los Angeles Kings Pierre-Luc Dubois	

Notes:

1. If Los Angeles fails to make the 2023 Stanley Cup playoffs, Columbus will instead their 2nd-round pick in 2023 and 2nd-round pick in 2024.
2. Los Angeles retains 30% of Provorov's contract.

=== Players acquired ===
Date	Player	Former team	Term	Via	Ref
July 13, 2022	Pheonix Copley	Washington Capitals	1-year	Free agency	
July 13, 2022	Tobie Paquette-Bisson	Laval Rocket (AHL)	1-year	Free agency	

=== Players lost ===
Date	Player	New team	Term	Via	Ref
July 13, 2022	Andreas Athanasiou	Chicago Blackhawks	1-year	Free agency	
July 13, 2022	Troy Stecher	Arizona Coyotes	1-year	Free agency	
July 14, 2022	Olli Maatta	Detroit Red Wings	1-year	Free agency	
July 14, 2022	Austin Strand	Anaheim Ducks	1-year	Free agency	
July 14, 2022	Christian Wolanin	Vancouver Canucks	1-year	Free agency	
July 15, 2022	Martin Frk	St. Louis Blues	1-year	Free agency	
September 13, 2022	Nelson Nogier	Barys Astana (KHL)	1-year	Free agency	

=== Signings ===
Date	Player	Term	Ref
July 8, 2022	Adrian Kempe	4-year	
July 11, 2022	Lias Andersson	1-year	
July 11, 2022	Carl Grundstrom	2-year	
July 12, 2022	Alexander Edler	1-year	
July 13, 2022	Brendan Lemieux	1-year	
July 23, 2022	Gabriel Vilardi	1-year	
July 23, 2022	Jaret Anderson-Dolan	1-year	
September 10, 2022	Mikey Anderson	1-year	
September 15, 2022	Sean Durzi	2-year	
December 15, 2022	Trevor Moore	5-year‡	
February 10, 2023	Pheonix Copley	1-year‡	
February 15, 2023	Mikey Anderson	8-year‡	
March 25, 2023	Cole Krygier	2-year†‡	
April 9, 2023	Alex Laferriere	3-year†	
April 22, 2023	Erik Portillo	2-year†‡	
June 7, 2023	Vladislav Gavrikov	2-year‡	

== Draft picks ==
Below are the Los Angeles Kings' selections at the 2022 NHL entry draft, which were held on July 7 to 8, 2022. It was held at the Bell Centre in Montreal, Quebec.

Round	#	Player	Pos	Nationality	College/Junior/Club team (League)
2	51	Jack Hughes	C	United States	Northeastern Huskies (HE)
4	103	Kenny Connors	C	United States	Dubuque Fighting Saints (USHL)
4	116	Angus Booth	D	Canada	Shawinigan Cataractes (QMJHL)
5	148	Otto Salin	D	Finland	HIFK (Liiga)
6	169	Jared Wright	RW	United States	Omaha Lancers (USHL)
6	180	Jack Sparkes	D	Canada	Lincoln Stars (USHL)
7	215	Kaleb Lawrence	C	Canada	Owen Sound Attack (OHL)
