= 2022–23 Philadelphia Flyers season =

National Hockey League season

2022–23 Philadelphia Flyers
- Division: 7th Metropolitan
- Conference: 14th Eastern
- 2022–23 record: 31–38–13
- Home record: 18–18–5
- Road record: 13–20–8
- Goals for: 222
- Goals against: 277

Team information
- General manager: Chuck Fletcher (Oct.–Mar.); Daniel Briere (Mar.–Apr.)
- Coach: John Tortorella
- Captain: Vacant
- Alternate captains: Scott Laughton; Vacant
- Arena: Wells Fargo Center
- Average attendance: 17,635
- Minor league affiliates: Lehigh Valley Phantoms (AHL); Reading Royals (ECHL)

Team leaders
- Goals: Travis Konecny (31)
- Assists: Kevin Hayes (36)
- Points: Travis Konecny (61)
- Penalty minutes: Nicolas Deslauriers (136)
- Plus/minus: Noah Cates; Brendan Lemieux; Lukas Sedlak (+3)
- Wins: Carter Hart (22)
- Goals against average: Carter Hart (2.94)

The 2022–23 Philadelphia Flyers season was the 56th season for the National Hockey League (NHL) franchise that was established on June 5, 1967. On April 1, 2023, the Flyers were eliminated from playoff contention after a loss to the Buffalo Sabres.

== Off-season ==
On June 17, John Tortorella was named the 23rd head coach in team history.

No captain was named to replace the departed Claude Giroux, who signed with the Ottawa Senators as a free agent following his stint with the Florida Panthers. In fact, only one player, Scott Laughton, was chosen by Tortorella to serve as an alternate captain throughout the entire season.

== Regular season ==
General manager Chuck Fletcher was fired on March 10 and replaced on an interim basis by Daniel Briere. The interim label was removed from Briere’s title a month after the regular season ended.

== Standings ==
=== Divisional standings ===
Metropolitan Division
Pos	Team	GP	W	L	OTL	RW	GF	GA	GD	Pts
1	y – Carolina Hurricanes	82	52	21	9	39	266	213	+53	113
2	x – New Jersey Devils	82	52	22	8	39	291	226	+65	112
3	x – New York Rangers	82	47	22	13	37	277	219	+58	107
4	x – New York Islanders	82	42	31	9	36	243	222	+21	93
5	Pittsburgh Penguins	82	40	31	11	31	262	264	−2	91
6	Washington Capitals	82	35	37	10	27	255	265	−10	80
7	Philadelphia Flyers	82	31	38	13	26	222	277	−55	75
8	Columbus Blue Jackets	82	25	48	9	15	214	330	−116	59

Source: National Hockey League
Rules for classification: 1) Fewer number of games played (GP, only during regular season); 2) Greater number of regulation wins (RW); 3) Greater number of wins in regulation and overtime, excluding shootout wins (ROW); 4) Greater number of total wins, including shootouts (W); 5) Greater number of points earned in head-to-head play; if teams played an uneven number of head-to-head games, the result of the first game on the home ice of the team with the extra home game is discarded; 6) Greater goal differential (GD); 7) Greater number of goals scored (GF)
x – Clinched playoff spot; y – Clinched division

=== Conference standings ===
Eastern Conference Wild Card
Pos	Div	Team	GP	W	L	OTL	RW	GF	GA	GD	Pts
1	ME	x – New York Islanders	82	42	31	9	36	243	222	+21	93
2	AT	x – Florida Panthers	82	42	32	8	36	290	273	+17	92
3	ME	Pittsburgh Penguins	82	40	31	11	31	262	264	−2	91
4	AT	Buffalo Sabres	82	42	33	7	30	296	300	−4	91
5	AT	Ottawa Senators	82	39	35	8	31	261	271	−10	86
6	AT	Detroit Red Wings	82	35	37	10	28	240	279	−39	80
7	ME	Washington Capitals	82	35	37	10	27	255	265	−10	80
8	ME	Philadelphia Flyers	82	31	38	13	26	222	277	−55	75
9	AT	Montreal Canadiens	82	31	45	6	21	232	307	−75	68
10	ME	Columbus Blue Jackets	82	25	48	9	15	214	330	−116	59

Source: National Hockey League
Rules for classification: 1) Fewer number of games played (GP, only during regular season); 2) Greater number of regulation wins (RW); 3) Greater number of wins in regulation and overtime, excluding shootout wins (ROW); 4) Greater number of total wins, including shootouts (W); 5) Greater number of points earned in head-to-head play; if teams played an uneven number of head-to-head games, the result of the first game on the home ice of the team with the extra home game is discarded; 6) Greater goal differential (GD); 7) Greater number of goals scored (GF)
x – Clinched playoff spot

== Schedule and results ==
=== Pre-season ===
The pre-season schedule was published on June 27, 2022.

2022 pre-season game log: 1–4–1 (home: 1–1–1; road: 0–3–0)

Game	Date	Opponent	Score	OT	Decision	Location	Attendance	Record	Recap
1	September 24	Boston	2–1		Grosenick	Wells Fargo Center	17,575	1–0–0	
2	September 27	@ Buffalo	1–2		Grosenick	KeyBank Center	9,125	1–1–0	
3	September 28	Washington	1–3		Sandstrom	Wells Fargo Center	16,114	1–2–0	
4	October 1	@ Boston	0–4		Grosenick	TD Garden	17,850	1–3–0	
5	October 2	@ NY Islanders	1–2		Ersson	UBS Arena	8,000	1–4–0	
6	October 4	NY Islanders	3–4	OT	Grosenick	Wells Fargo Center	16,903	1–4–1	

=== Regular season ===
The regular season schedule was published on July 6, 2022.

2022–23 game log
October: 5–2–1 (home: 3–1–1; road: 2–1–0)

Game	Date	Opponent	Score	OT	Decision	Location	Attendance	Record	Points	Recap
1	October 13	New Jersey	5–2		Hart	Wells Fargo Center	19,107	1–0–0	2	
2	October 15	Vancouver	3–2		Hart	Wells Fargo Center	14,837	2–0–0	4	
3	October 18	@ Tampa Bay	3–2		Hart	Amalie Arena	19,092	3–0–0	6	
4	October 19	@ Florida	3–4		Sandstrom	FLA Live Arena	17,421	3–1–0	6	
5	October 22	@ Nashville	3–1		Hart	Bridgestone Arena	17,470	4–1–0	8	
6	October 23	San Jose	0–3		Sandstrom	Wells Fargo Center	14,512	4–2–0	8	
7	October 27	Florida	4–3		Hart	Wells Fargo Center	14,871	5–2–0	10	
8	October 29	Carolina	3–4	OT	Hart	Wells Fargo Center	13,335	5–2–1	11	

November: 3–8–4 (home: 2–4–0; road: 1–4–4)

Game	Date	Opponent	Score	OT	Decision	Location	Attendance	Record	Points	Recap
9	November 1	@ NY Rangers	0–1	OT	Hart	Madison Square Garden	17,206	5–2–2	12	
10	November 2	@ Toronto	2–5		Sandstrom	Scotiabank Arena	18,437	5–3–2	12	
11	November 5	@ Ottawa	2–1		Hart	Canadian Tire Centre	16,722	6–3–2	14	
12	November 8	St. Louis	5–1		Sandstrom	Wells Fargo Center	15,228	7–3–2	16	
13	November 10	@ Columbus	2–5		Hart	Nationwide Arena	15,490	7–4–2	16	
14	November 12	Ottawa	1–4		Hart	Wells Fargo Center	16,912	7–5–2	16	
15	November 13	Dallas	1–5		Sandstrom	Wells Fargo Center	16,898	7–6–2	16	
16	November 15	@ Columbus	4–5	OT	Hart	Nationwide Arena	15,713	7–6–3	17	
17	November 17	@ Boston	1–4		Hart	TD Garden	17,850	7–7–3	17	
18	November 19	@ Montreal	4–5	SO	Hart	Bell Centre	21,105	7–7–4	18	
19	November 21	Calgary	2–5		Hart	Wells Fargo Center	17,896	7–8–4	18	
20	November 23	@ Washington	2–3	OT	Sandstrom	Capital One Arena	18,573	7–8–5	19	
21	November 25	Pittsburgh	1–4		Hart	Wells Fargo Center	19,309	7–9–5	19	
22	November 26	@ NY Islanders	2–5		Sandstrom	UBS Arena	17,255	7–10–5	19	
23	November 29	NY Islanders	3–1		Hart	Wells Fargo Center	18,143	8–10–5	21	

December: 5–7–2 (home: 2–4–0; road: 3–3–2)

Game	Date	Opponent	Score	OT	Decision	Location	Attendance	Record	Points	Recap
24	December 1	Tampa Bay	1–4		Hart	Wells Fargo Center	17,867	8–11–5	21	
25	December 3	New Jersey	2–3		Hart	Wells Fargo Center	18,427	8–12–5	21	
26	December 5	Colorado	5–3		Hart	Wells Fargo Center	18,361	9–12–5	23	
27	December 7	Washington	1–4		Hart	Wells Fargo Center	16,826	9–13–5	23	
28	December 9	@ Vegas	1–2	OT	Hart	T-Mobile Arena	17,767	9–13–6	24	
29	December 11	@ Arizona	4–5	OT	Hart	Mullett Arena	4,600	9–13–7	25	
30	December 13	@ Colorado	2–3		Sandstrom	Ball Arena	18,082	9–14–7	25	
31	December 15	@ New Jersey	2–1		Hart	Prudential Center	14,137	10–14–7	27	
32	December 17	NY Rangers	3–6		Hart	Wells Fargo Center	18,340	10–15–7	27	
33	December 20	Columbus	5–3		Hart	Wells Fargo Center	19,432	11–15–7	29	
34	December 22	@ Toronto	3–4		Hart	Scotiabank Arena	18,908	11–16–7	29	
35	December 23	@ Carolina	5–6		Hart	PNC Arena	18,680	11–17–7	29	
36	December 29	@ San Jose	4–3	OT	Ersson	SAP Center	17,562	12–17–7	31	
37	December 31	@ Los Angeles	4–2		Ersson	Crypto.com Arena	18,230	13–17–7	33	

January: 8–4–2 (home: 3–3–1; road: 5–1–1)

Game	Date	Opponent	Score	OT	Decision	Location	Attendance	Record	Points	Recap
38	January 2	@ Anaheim	4–1		Ersson	Honda Center	13,600	14–17–7	35	
39	January 5	Arizona	6–2		Hart	Wells Fargo Center	17,572	15–17–7	37	
40	January 8	Toronto	2–6		Hart	Wells Fargo Center	17,862	15–18–7	37	
41	January 9	@ Buffalo	4–0		Ersson	KeyBank Center	11,271	16–18–7	39	
42	January 11	Washington	5–3		Hart	Wells Fargo Center	17,352	17–18–7	41	
43	January 14	@ Washington	3–1		Hart	Capital One Arena	18,573	18–18–7	43	
44	January 16	@ Boston	0–6		Hart	TD Garden	17,850	18–19–7	43	
45	January 17	Anaheim	5–2		Ersson	Wells Fargo Center	16,312	19–19–7	45	
46	January 19	Chicago	1–4		Hart	Wells Fargo Center	16,460	19–20–7	45	
47	January 21	@ Detroit	2–1		Hart	Little Caesars Arena	19,515	20–20–7	47	
48	January 22	Winnipeg	3–5		Sandstrom	Wells Fargo Center	15,441	20–21–7	47	
49	January 24	Los Angeles	3–4	OT	Hart	Wells Fargo Center	15,602	20–21–8	48	
50	January 26	@ Minnesota	2–3	OT	Hart	Xcel Energy Center	19,177	20–21–9	49	
51	January 28	@ Winnipeg	4–0		Hart	Canada Life Centre	14,476	21–21–9	51	

February: 2–7–1 (home: 1–3–1; road: 1–4–0)

Game	Date	Opponent	Score	OT	Decision	Location	Attendance	Record	Points	Recap
52	February 6	NY Islanders	1–2		Hart	Wells Fargo Center	18,695	21–22–9	51	
53	February 9	Edmonton	2–1	SO	Hart	Wells Fargo Center	18,851	22–22–9	53	
54	February 11	Nashville	1–2	OT	Hart	Wells Fargo Center	19,412	22–22–10	54	
55	February 12	Seattle	3–4		Sandstrom	Wells Fargo Center	18,129	22–23–10	54	
56	February 16	@ Seattle	2–6		Hart	Climate Pledge Arena	17,151	22–24–10	54	
57	February 18	@ Vancouver	2–6		Hart	Rogers Arena	18,799	22–25–10	54	
58	February 20	@ Calgary	4–3		Ersson	Scotiabank Saddledome	19,036	23–25–10	56	
59	February 21	@ Edmonton	2–4		Hart	Rogers Place	18,347	23–26–10	56	
60	February 24	Montreal	2–5		Hart	Wells Fargo Center	19,661	23–27–10	56	
61	February 25	@ New Jersey	0–7		Ersson	Prudential Center	16,514	23–28–10	56	

March: 6–4–3 (home: 6–1–2; road: 0–3–1)

Game	Date	Opponent	Score	OT	Decision	Location	Attendance	Record	Points	Recap
62	March 1	NY Rangers	2–3	OT	Hart	Wells Fargo Center	19,534	23–28–11	57	
63	March 5	Detroit	3–1		Hart	Wells Fargo Center	17,630	24–28–11	59	
64	March 7	@ Tampa Bay	2–5		Hart	Amalie Arena	19,092	24–29–11	59	
65	March 9	@ Carolina	0–1		Sandstrom	PNC Arena	18,680	24–30–11	59	
66	March 11	@ Pittsburgh	1–5		Hart	PPG Paints Arena	18,254	24–31–11	59	
67	March 14	Vegas	3–5		Sandstrom	Wells Fargo Center	17,192	24–32–11	59	
68	March 17	Buffalo	5–2		Hart	Wells Fargo Center	18,051	25–32–11	61	
69	March 18	Carolina	4–5	OT	Sandstrom	Wells Fargo Center	18,975	25–32–12	62	
70	March 21	Florida	6–3		Hart	Wells Fargo Center	16,479	26–32–12	64	
71	March 23	Minnesota	5–4	SO	Hart	Wells Fargo Center	18,495	27–32–12	66	
72	March 25	Detroit	3–0		Hart	Wells Fargo Center	18,216	28–32–12	68	
73	March 28	Montreal	3–2		Sandstrom	Wells Fargo Center	18,916	29–32–12	70	
74	March 30	@ Ottawa	4–5	OT	Sandstrom	Canadian Tire Centre	17,518	29–32–13	71	

April: 2–6–0 (home: 1–2–0; road: 1–4–0)

Game	Date	Opponent	Score	OT	Decision	Location	Attendance	Record	Points	Recap
75	April 1	Buffalo	3–6		Sandstrom	Wells Fargo Center	19,404	29–33–13	71	
76	April 2	@ Pittsburgh	2–4		Ersson	PPG Paints Arena	18,310	29–34–13	71	
77	April 4	@ St. Louis	2–4		Ersson	Enterprise Center	18,096	29–35–13	71	
78	April 6	@ Dallas	1–4		Hart	American Airlines Center	18,532	29–36–13	71	
79	April 8	@ NY Islanders	0–4		Hart	UBS Arena	17,255	29–37–13	71	
80	April 9	Boston	3–5		Sandstrom	Wells Fargo Center	18,776	29–38–13	71	
81	April 11	Columbus	4–3	OT	Hart	Wells Fargo Center	19,719	30–38–13	73	
82	April 13	@ Chicago	5–4	OT	Sandstrom	United Center	20,219	31–38–13	75	

Legend: = Win = Loss = OT/SO Loss

== Player statistics ==
=== Skaters ===
Regular season
Player	GP	G	A	Pts	+/−	PIM
Travis Konecny	60	31	30	61	–12	77
Kevin Hayes	81	18	36	54	–22	23
Owen Tippett	77	27	22	49	–17	16
Morgan Frost	81	19	27	46	–12	24
Scott Laughton	78	18	25	43	–9	50
Tony DeAngelo	70	11	31	42	–27	73
Joel Farabee	82	15	24	39	–1	41
Noah Cates	82	13	25	38	+3	12
James van Riemsdyk	61	12	17	29	–3	28
Ivan Provorov	82	6	21	27	–17	24
Travis Sanheim	81	7	16	23	–5	40
Rasmus Ristolainen	74	3	17	20	–4	32
Cam York	54	2	18	20	–1	18
Wade Allison	60	9	6	15	–3	36
Nick Seeler	77	4	10	14	+1	56
Nicolas Deslauriers	80	6	6	12	–11	136
Zack MacEwen^{‡}	46	4	5	9	–9	54
Lukas Sedlak^{†‡}	27	3	5	8	+3	12
Tyson Foerster	8	3	4	7	+2	8
Patrick Brown^{‡}	43	2	5	7	–6	17
Brendan Lemieux^{†}	18	2	4	6	+3	21
Tanner Laczynski	32	2	2	4	–5	2
Egor Zamula	14	0	4	4	0	2
Kieffer Bellows^{†}	27	3	0	3	–7	6
Justin Braun	51	0	2	2	–1	19
Olle Lycksell	8	0	1	1	–3	8
Max Willman	9	0	0	0	–3	4
Hayden Hodgson	1	0	0	0	0	0
Adam Ginning	1	0	0	0	0	2
Ronnie Attard	2	0	0	0	0	0
Elliot Desnoyers	4	0	0	0	–2	0
Jackson Cates	5	0	0	0	0	0

=== Goaltenders ===
Regular season
Player	GP	GS	TOI	W	L	OT	GA	GAA	SA	SV%	SO	G	A	PIM
Carter Hart	55	54	3,163:46	22	23	10	155	2.94	1,665	.907	2	0	0	0
Samuel Ersson	12	10	644:55	6	3	0	33	3.07	327	.899	1	0	0	0
Felix Sandstrom	20	18	1,112:51	3	12	3	69	3.72	575	.880	0	0	0	0

^{†}Denotes player spent time with another team before joining the Flyers. Stats reflect time with the Flyers only.
^{‡}Denotes player was traded mid-season. Stats reflect time with the Flyers only.
Bold/italics denotes franchise record.

== Awards and records ==
=== Awards ===
Type	Award/honor	Recipient	Ref
League (in-season)	NHL All-Star Game selection	Kevin Hayes	
Team	Barry Ashbee Trophy	Ivan Provorov	
Team	Bobby Clarke Trophy	Carter Hart	
Team	Gene Hart Memorial Award	Carter Hart	
Team	Pelle Lindbergh Memorial Trophy	Owen Tippett	
Team	Toyota Cup	Carter Hart	
Team	Yanick Dupre Memorial Class Guy Award	Justin Braun	

=== Milestones ===
Milestone	Player	Date	Ref
First game	Olle Lycksell	October 15, 2022	
First game	Samuel Ersson	December 23, 2022	
First game	Elliot Desnoyers	February 25, 2023	
First game	Tyson Foerster	March 9, 2023	
First game	Adam Ginning	April 11, 2023	

== Transactions ==
The Flyers have been involved in the following transactions during the 2022–23 season.

Key:

† Contract is entry-level.
‡ Contract initially takes effect in the 2023–24 season.

=== Trades ===
Date	Details		Ref
July 8, 2022	To Carolina Hurricanes 2nd-round pick in 2024; Conditional^{1} 3rd-round pick in 2023; 4th-round pick in 2022	To Philadelphia Flyers Tony DeAngelo; 7th-round pick in 2022	
October 26, 2022	To Chicago Blackhawks Cooper Zech	To Philadelphia Flyers Evan Barratt	
February 26, 2023	To Nashville Predators Isaac Ratcliffe	To Philadelphia Flyers Future considerations	
March 3, 2023	To Los Angeles Kings Zack MacEwen	To Philadelphia Flyers Brendan Lemieux; 5th-round pick in 2024	
March 3, 2023	To Ottawa Senators Patrick Brown	To Philadelphia Flyers 6th-round pick in 2023	
June 6, 2023	To Columbus Blue Jackets Ivan Provorov^{2}	To Philadelphia Flyers Helge Grans; Cal Petersen; Sean Walker; LAK 1st-round pick in 2023; LAK 2nd-round pick in 2024; Conditional CBJ 2nd-round pick in 2024 or 2025	
June 6, 2023	To Los Angeles Kings Kevin Connauton; Hayden Hodgson	To Philadelphia Flyers Helge Grans; Cal Petersen; Sean Walker; LAK 1st-round pick in 2023; LAK 2nd-round pick in 2024; Conditional CBJ 2nd-round pick in 2024 or 2025	
June 27, 2023	To St. Louis Blues Kevin Hayes^{3}	To Philadelphia Flyers 6th-round pick in 2024	

Notes:

1. Carolina will receive the lower of Florida's, Philadelphia's, or the New York Rangers' 3rd-round pick in 2023.
2. Los Angeles retains 30% of Provorov's contract.
3. Philadelphia retains 50% of Hayes' contract.

=== Players acquired ===
Date	Player	Former team	Term	Via	Ref
July 13, 2022	Louie Belpedio	Montreal Canadiens	1-year	Free agency	
July 13, 2022	Justin Braun	New York Rangers	1-year	Free agency	
July 13, 2022	Adam Brooks	Winnipeg Jets	2-year	Free agency	
July 13, 2022	Nicolas Deslauriers	Minnesota Wild	4-year	Free agency	
July 13, 2022	Troy Grosenick	Boston Bruins	1-year	Free agency	
July 13, 2022	Cooper Marody	Edmonton Oilers	2-year	Free agency	
October 19, 2022	Lukas Sedlak	Colorado Avalanche		Waivers	
October 27, 2022	Kieffer Bellows	New York Islanders		Waivers	
March 7, 2023	Will Zmolek	Bemidji State Beavers (CCHA)	1-year†‡	Free agency	

=== Players lost ===
Date	Player	New team	Term	Via	Ref
July 13, 2022	Martin Jones	Seattle Kraken	1-year	Free agency	
July 13, 2022	Oskar Lindblom	San Jose Sharks	2-year	Free agency	
July 13, 2022	Kirill Ustimenko	Traktor Chelyabinsk (KHL)	2-year	Free agency	
July 18, 2022	Adam Clendening	Rockford IceHogs (AHL)	1-year	Free agency	
August 16, 2022	Ryan Fitzgerald	Lehigh Valley Phantoms (AHL)	1-year	Free agency	
September 9, 2022	Matthew Strome	Hershey Bears (AHL)	1-year	Free agency	
September 19, 2022	Brennan Menell	Dynamo Moscow (KHL)	1-year	Free agency	
September 20, 2022	Keith Yandle			Retirement	
October 11, 2022	Nate Thompson	Ontario Reign (AHL)		Free agency	
October 14, 2022	Linus Sandin	Rogle BK (SHL)	3-year	Mutual termination	
December 17, 2022	Lukas Sedlak			Contract termination	
December 18, 2022	Lukas Sedlak	HC Dynamo Pardubice (ELH)	3-year	Free agency	
February 9, 2023	Linus Hogberg			Mutual termination	
February 11, 2023	Linus Hogberg	Skelleftea AIK (SHL)	1-year	Free agency	
June 8, 2023	Evan Barratt	Nurnberg Ice Tigers (DEL)	1-year	Free agency	
June 27, 2023	Justin Braun	Straubing Tigers (DEL)	1-year	Free agency	

=== Signings ===
Date	Player	Term	Ref
July 8, 2022	Tony DeAngelo	2-year	
July 13, 2022	Kevin Connauton	2-year	
July 15, 2022	Morgan Frost	1-year	
July 19, 2022	Isaac Ratcliffe	1-year	
July 27, 2022	Tanner Laczynski	2-year	
July 29, 2022	Owen Tippett	2-year	
August 2, 2022	Zack MacEwen	1-year	
August 15, 2022	Jackson Cates	1-year	
August 26, 2022	Wade Allison	2-year	
August 26, 2022	Linus Hogberg	1-year	
August 29, 2022	Hayden Hodgson	2-year	
October 19, 2022	Travis Sanheim	8-year‡	
December 31, 2022	Ethan Samson	3-year†‡	
March 27, 2023	Emil Andrae	3-year†‡	
May 2, 2023	Egor Zamula	1-year‡	
June 24, 2023	Louie Belpedio	2-year‡	

== Draft picks ==
Below are the Philadelphia Flyers' selections at the 2022 NHL entry draft, which was held on July 7 to 8, 2022, at Bell Centre in Montreal.

Round	#	Player	Pos.	Nationality	Team (league)
1	5	Cutter Gauthier	LW	USA	U.S. NTDP (USHL)
3	69	Devin Kaplan	RW	USA	U.S. NTDP (USHL)
5	133	Alex Bump	LW	USA	Omaha Lancers (USHL)
6	165	Hunter McDonald	D	USA	Chicago Steel (USHL)
7	197	Santeri Sulku	LW	Finland	Jokerit (U20 SM-sarja)
7	220	Alexis Gendron	RW	Canada	Blainville-Boisbriand Armada (QMJHL)
