= 2022–23 Minnesota Wild season =

National Hockey League season

2022–23 Minnesota Wild
- Division: 3rd Central
- Conference: 6th Western
- 2022–23 record: 46–25–11
- Home record: 25–12–4
- Road record: 21–13–7
- Goals for: 246
- Goals against: 225

Team information
- General manager: Bill Guerin
- Coach: Dean Evason
- Captain: Jared Spurgeon
- Alternate captains: Matt Dumba; Marcus Foligno
- Arena: Xcel Energy Center
- Average attendance: 18,454
- Minor league affiliates: Iowa Wild (AHL); Iowa Heartlanders (ECHL)

Team leaders
- Goals: Kirill Kaprizov (40)
- Assists: Mats Zuccarello (45)
- Points: Kirill Kaprizov (75)
- Penalty minutes: Marcus Foligno (97)
- Plus/minus: Jared Spurgeon (+32)
- Wins: Marc-Andre Fleury (24)
- Goals against average: Filip Gustavsson (2.10)

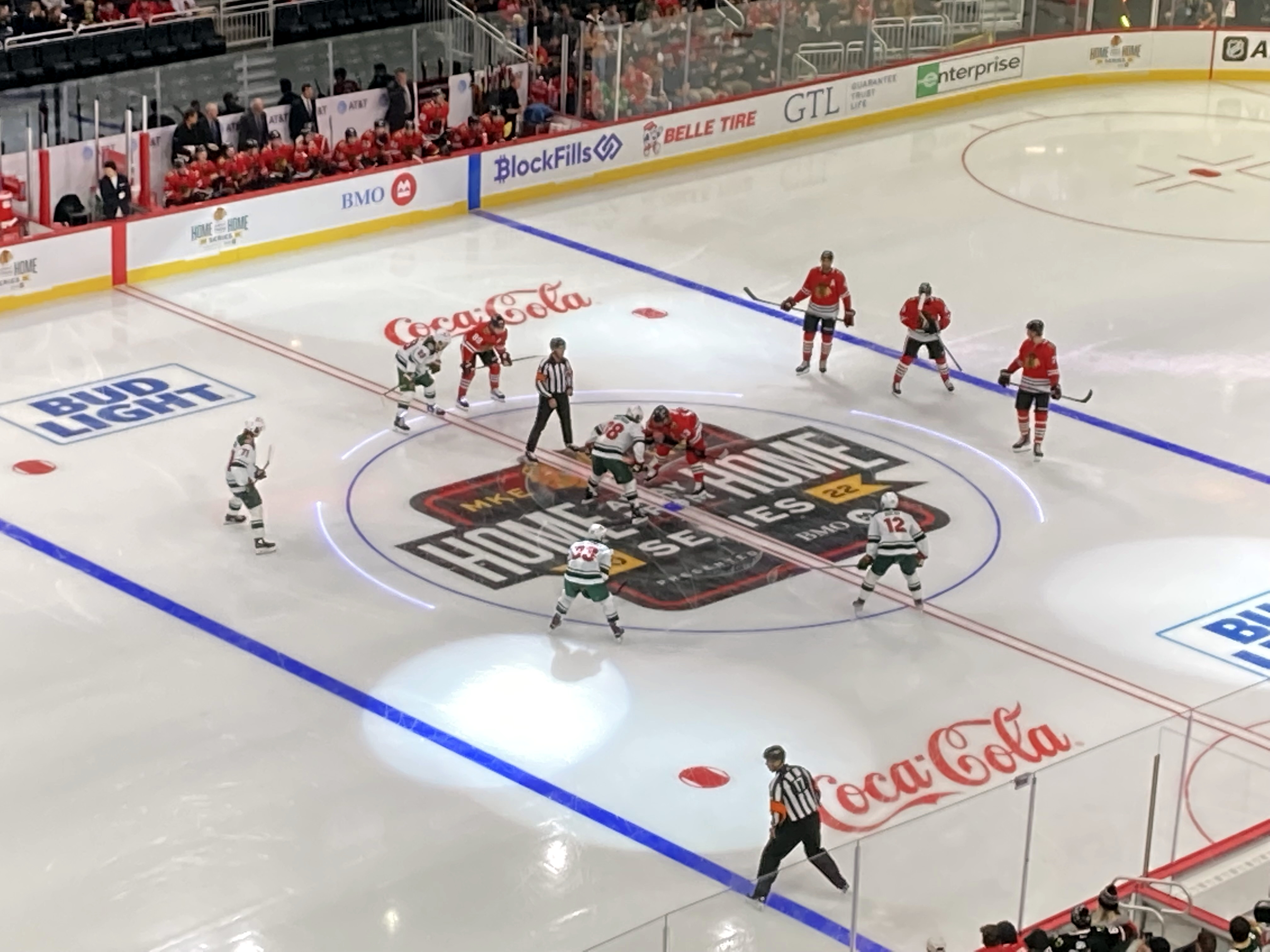
During a preseason game between the Wild and Chicago Blackhawks in Milwaukee

The 2022–23 Minnesota Wild season was the 23rd season for the National Hockey League (NHL) franchise that was established on June 25, 1997. On April 3, 2023, the Wild clinched a playoff spot after a shootout loss to the Vegas Golden Knights and after the Dallas Stars defeated the Nashville Predators. The Wild lost their eighth consecutive playoff series on April 28, 2023, after the Stars eliminated them in six games.

== Standings ==
=== Divisional standings ===
Central Division
Pos	Team	GP	W	L	OTL	RW	GF	GA	GD	Pts
1	y – Colorado Avalanche	82	51	24	7	36	280	226	+54	109
2	x – Dallas Stars	82	47	21	14	39	285	218	+67	108
3	x – Minnesota Wild	82	46	25	11	34	246	225	+21	103
4	x – Winnipeg Jets	82	46	33	3	36	247	225	+22	95
5	Nashville Predators	82	42	32	8	29	229	238	−9	92
6	St. Louis Blues	82	37	38	7	27	263	301	−38	81
7	Arizona Coyotes	82	28	40	14	20	228	299	−71	70
8	Chicago Blackhawks	82	26	49	7	18	204	301	−97	59

Source: National Hockey League
Rules for classification: 1) Fewer number of games played (GP, only during regular season); 2) Greater number of regulation wins (RW); 3) Greater number of wins in regulation and overtime, excluding shootout wins (ROW); 4) Greater number of total wins, including shootouts (W); 5) Greater number of points earned in head-to-head play; if teams played an uneven number of head-to-head games, the result of the first game on the home ice of the team with the extra home game is discarded; 6) Greater goal differential (GD); 7) Greater number of goals scored (GF)
x – Clinched playoff spot; y – Clinched division

=== Conference standings ===
Western Conference Wild Card
Pos	Div	Team	GP	W	L	OTL	RW	GF	GA	GD	Pts
1	PA	x – Seattle Kraken	82	46	28	8	37	289	256	+33	100
2	CE	x – Winnipeg Jets	82	46	33	3	36	247	225	+22	95
3	PA	Calgary Flames	82	38	27	17	31	260	252	+8	93
4	CE	Nashville Predators	82	42	32	8	29	229	238	−9	92
5	PA	Vancouver Canucks	82	38	37	7	24	276	298	−22	83
6	CE	St. Louis Blues	82	37	38	7	27	263	301	−38	81
7	CE	Arizona Coyotes	82	28	40	14	20	228	299	−71	70
8	PA	San Jose Sharks	82	22	44	16	16	234	321	−87	60
9	CE	Chicago Blackhawks	82	26	49	7	18	204	301	−97	59
10	PA	Anaheim Ducks	82	23	47	12	13	209	338	−129	58

Source: National Hockey League
Rules for classification: 1) Fewer number of games played (GP, only during regular season); 2) Greater number of regulation wins (RW); 3) Greater number of wins in regulation and overtime, excluding shootout wins (ROW); 4) Greater number of total wins, including shootouts (W); 5) Greater number of points earned in head-to-head play; if teams played an uneven number of head-to-head games, the result of the first game on the home ice of the team with the extra home game is discarded; 6) Greater goal differential (GD); 7) Greater number of goals scored (GF)
x – Clinched playoff spot

== Schedule and results ==
=== Regular season ===
2022–23 game log

October: 4–4–1 (home: 1–3–0; road: 3–1–1)
#	Date	Visitor	Score	Home	OT	Decision	Attendance	Record	Pts	Recap
1	October 13	NY Rangers	7–3	Minnesota		Fleury	18,612	0–1–0	0
2	October 15	Los Angeles	7–6	Minnesota		Gustavsson	18,421	0–2–0	0
3	October 17	Colorado	6–3	Minnesota		Gustavsson	17,437	0–3–0	0
4	October 20	Vancouver	3–4	Minnesota	OT	Fleury	17,323	1–3–0	2
5	October 22	Minnesota	3–4	Boston	OT	Fleury	17,850	1–3–1	3
6	October 25	Minnesota	3–1	Montreal		Fleury	20,867	2–3–1	5
7	October 27	Minnesota	4–2	Ottawa		Fleury	13,870	3–3–1	7
8	October 29	Minnesota	1–2	Detroit		Gustavsson	17,364	3–4–1	7
9	October 30	Minnesota	4–3	Chicago	SO	Fleury	14,149	4–4–1	9

November: 6–5–1 (home: 4–3–1; road: 2–2–0)
#	Date	Visitor	Score	Home	OT	Decision	Attendance	Record	Pts	Recap
10	November 1	Montreal	1–4	Minnesota		Fleury	16,385	5–4–1	11
11	November 3	Seattle	4–0	Minnesota		Fleury	17,221	5–5–1	11
12	November 8	Minnesota	0–1	Los Angeles		Fleury	13,558	5–6–1	11
13	November 9	Minnesota	4–1	Anaheim		Gustavsson	14,803	6–6–1	13
14	November 11	Minnesota	1–0	Seattle		Fleury	17,151	7–6–1	15
15	November 13	San Jose	3–2	Minnesota	SO	Gustavsson	17,105	7–6–2	16
16	November 15	Minnesota	1–2	Nashville		Fleury	17,159	7–7–2	16
17	November 17	Pittsburgh	6–4	Minnesota		Gustavsson	18,224	7–8–2	16
18	November 19	Carolina	1–2	Minnesota	OT	Gustavsson	18,278	8–8–2	18
19	November 23	Winnipeg	1–6	Minnesota		Gustavsson	17,450	9–8–2	20
20	November 25	Toronto	4–3	Minnesota		Fleury	18,997	9–9–2	20
21	November 27	Arizona	3–4	Minnesota		Fleury	17,745	10–9–2	22

December: 11–4–0 (home: 6–1–0; road: 5–3–0)
#	Date	Visitor	Score	Home	OT	Decision	Attendance	Record	Pts	Recap
22	December 1	Edmonton	3–5	Minnesota		Fleury	17,651	11–9–2	24
23	December 3	Anaheim	4–5	Minnesota	SO	Gustavsson	17,822	12–9–2	26
24	December 4	Minnesota	6–5	Dallas	SO	Fleury	18,120	13–9–2	28
25	December 7	Minnesota	3–5	Calgary		Fleury	17,562	13–10–2	28
26	December 9	Minnesota	2–5	Edmonton		Fleury	17,589	13–11–2	28
27	December 10	Minnesota	3–0	Vancouver		Gustavsson	18,526	14–11–2	30
28	December 12	Edmonton	1–2	Minnesota		Fleury	17,707	15–11–2	32
29	December 14	Detroit	1–4	Minnesota		Gustavsson	18,324	16–11–2	34
30	December 16	Chicago	1–4	Minnesota		Fleury	18,501	17–11–2	36
31	December 18	Ottawa	2–4	Minnesota		Gustavsson	18,213	18–11–2	38
32	December 21	Minnesota	4–1	Anaheim		Fleury	14,961	19–11–2	40
33	December 22	Minnesota	2–5	San Jose		Gustavsson	13,128	19–12–2	40
34	December 27	Minnesota	4–1	Winnipeg		Gustavsson	15,325	20–12–2	42
35	December 29	Dallas	4–1	Minnesota		Fleury	19,316	20–13–2	42
36	December 31	Minnesota	5–2	St. Louis		Fleury	18,096	21–13–2	44

January: 6–4–2 (home: 4–1–0; road: 2–3–2)
#	Date	Visitor	Score	Home	OT	Decision	Attendance	Record	Pts	Recap
37	January 4	Tampa Bay	1–5	Minnesota		Gustavsson	18,427	22–13–2	46
38	January 7	Minnesota	5–6	Buffalo	OT	Fleury	19,070	22–13–3	47
39	January 8	St. Louis	3–0	Minnesota		Gustavsson	18,745	22–14–3	47
40	January 10	Minnesota	3–4	NY Rangers	SO	Fleury	18,006	22–14–4	48
41	January 12	Minnesota	3–1	NY Islanders		Gustavsson	17,255	23–14–4	50
42	January 14	Arizona	1–2	Minnesota		Fleury	19,299	24–14–4	52
43	January 17	Minnesota	4–2	Washington		Gustavsson	18,573	25–14–4	54
44	January 19	Minnesota	2–5	Carolina		Fleury	18,013	25–15–4	54
45	January 21	Minnesota	3–5	Florida		Gustavsson	16,759	25–16–4	54
46	January 24	Minnesota	2–4	Tampa Bay		Fleury	19,092	25–17–4	54
47	January 26	Philadelphia	2–3	Minnesota	SO	Fleury	19,177	26–17–4	56
48	January 28	Buffalo	2–3	Minnesota	SO	Fleury	19,212	27–17–4	58

February: 7–4–2 (home: 6–2–1; road: 1–2–1)
#	Date	Visitor	Score	Home	OT	Decision	Attendance	Record	Pts	Recap
49	February 6	Minnesota	2–3	Arizona		Fleury	4,600	27–18–4	58
50	February 8	Minnesota	1–4	Dallas		Gustavsson	18,274	27–19–4	58
51	February 9	Vegas	5–1	Minnesota		Fleury	18,797	27–20–4	58
52	February 11	New Jersey	2–3	Minnesota	SO	Gustavsson	19,065	28–20–4	60
53	February 13	Florida	2–1	Minnesota	SO	Gustavsson	17,453	28–20–5	61
54	February 15	Colorado	3–2	Minnesota		Fleury	17,965	28–21–5	61
55	February 17	Dallas	1–2	Minnesota	SO	Gustavsson	19,239	29–21–5	63
56	February 19	Nashville	3–4	Minnesota		Gustavsson	19,255	30–21–5	65
57	February 21	Los Angeles	1–2	Minnesota		Gustavsson	18,012	31–21–5	67
58	February 23	Minnesota	2–0	Columbus		Fleury	17,997	32–21–5	69
59	February 24	Minnesota	1–2	Toronto	OT	Gustavsson	18,575	32–21–6	70
60	February 26	Columbus	2–3	Minnesota	OT	Fleury	19,063	33–21–6	72
61	February 28	NY Islanders	1–2	Minnesota	SO	Gustavsson	18,431	34–21–6	74

March: 10–1–3 (home: 3–1–1; road: 7–0–2)
#	Date	Visitor	Score	Home	OT	Decision	Attendance	Record	Pts	Recap
62	March 2	Minnesota	2–1	Vancouver		Fleury	18,903	35–21–6	76
63	March 4	Minnesota	3–0	Calgary		Gustavsson	18,605	36–21–6	78
64	March 7	Calgary	1–0	Minnesota	SO	Gustavsson	18,998	36–21–7	79
65	March 8	Minnesota	4–2	Winnipeg		Fleury	13,148	37–21–7	81
66	March 11	Minnesota	5–2	San Jose		Fleury	17,562	38–21–7	83
67	March 12	Minnesota	4–5	Arizona	OT	Gustavsson	4,600	38–21–8	84
68	March 15	Minnesota	8–5	St. Louis		Fleury	18,096	39–21–8	86
69	March 18	Boston	5–2	Minnesota		Gustavsson	19,329	39–22–8	86
70	March 19	Washington	3–5	Minnesota		Fleury	19,231	40–22–8	88
71	March 21	Minnesota	2–1	New Jersey	OT	Gustavsson	16,124	41–22–8	90
72	March 23	Minnesota	4–5	Philadelphia	SO	Fleury	18,495	41–22–9	91
73	March 25	Chicago	1–3	Minnesota		Gustavsson	19,312	42–22–9	93
74	March 27	Seattle	1–5	Minnesota		Fleury	19,291	43–22–9	95
75	March 29	Minnesota	4–2	Colorado		Gustavsson	18,140	44–22–9	97

April: 2–3–2 (home: 1–1–1; road: 1–2–1)
#	Date	Visitor	Score	Home	OT	Decision	Attendance	Record	Pts	Recap
76	April 1	Minnesota	1–4	Vegas		Fleury	18,398	44–23–9	97
77	April 3	Vegas	4–3	Minnesota	SO	Gustavsson	19,176	44–23–10	98
78	April 6	Minnesota	1–4	Pittsburgh		Fleury	18,417	44–24–10	98
79	April 8	St. Louis	3–5	Minnesota		Gustavsson	19,191	45–24–10	100
80	April 10	Minnesota	4–2	Chicago		Gustavsson	15,268	46–24–10	102
81	April 11	Winnipeg	3–1	Minnesota		Fleury	19,199	46–25–10	102
82	April 13	Minnesota	3–4	Nashville	OT	Gustavsson	17,519	46–25–11	103

Legend: Win (2 points) Loss (0 points) Overtime/shootout loss (1 point)

=== Playoffs ===
2023 Stanley Cup playoffs

Western Conference first round vs. (C2) Dallas Stars: Dallas won 4–2
#	Date	Visitor	Score	Home	OT	Decision	Attendance	Series	Recap
1	April 17	Minnesota	3–2	Dallas	2OT	Gustavsson	18,532	1–0
2	April 19	Minnesota	3–7	Dallas		Fleury	18,532	1–1
3	April 21	Dallas	1–5	Minnesota		Gustavsson	19,309	2–1
4	April 23	Dallas	3–2	Minnesota		Gustavsson	19,331	2–2
5	April 25	Minnesota	0–4	Dallas		Gustavsson	18,532	2–3
6	April 28	Dallas	4–1	Minnesota		Gustavsson	19,389	2–4

Legend: Win Loss

== Player statistics ==
=== Skaters ===
Regular season
Player	GP	G	A	Pts	+/−	PIM
Kirill Kaprizov	67	40	35	75	+4	45
Mats Zuccarello	78	22	45	67	−3	26
Matthew Boldy	81	31	32	63	+1	39
Joel Eriksson Ek	78	23	38	61	+4	44
Frederick Gaudreau	82	19	19	38	+10	10
Ryan Hartman	59	15	22	37	+7	90
Jared Spurgeon	79	11	23	34	+32	14
Calen Addison	62	3	26	29	−17	22
Sam Steel	65	10	18	28	+11	18
Marcus Foligno	65	7	14	21	−6	97
Connor Dewar	81	6	12	18	−5	50
Marcus Johansson^{†}	20	6	12	18	+6	0
Mason Shaw	59	7	10	17	−1	79
Ryan Reaves^{†}	61	5	10	15	−1	31
Jacob Middleton	79	3	12	15	+15	72
Matt Dumba	79	4	10	14	−8	81
Jonas Brodin	60	3	11	14	+13	30
Jon Merrill	73	2	10	12	−2	38
Brandon Duhaime	51	9	1	10	+6	42
John Klingberg^{†}	17	2	7	9	+3	4
Oskar Sundqvist^{†}	15	3	4	7	0	8
Jordan Greenway^{‡}	45	2	5	7	−3	26
Alex Goligoski	46	2	4	6	−9	16
Gustav Nyquist^{†}	3	1	4	5	+2	0
Nic Petan	10	1	2	3	0	2
Tyson Jost	12	0	3	3	−4	11
Sammy Walker	9	1	1	2	−1	0
Joseph Cramarossa	4	1	0	1	0	4
Marco Rossi	19	0	1	1	−7	8
Damien Giroux	1	0	1	1	0	2
Brock Faber	2	0	0	0	+2	0
Adam Beckman	9	0	0	0	−2	0
Nick Swaney	1	0	0	0	0	0
Steven Fogarty	2	0	0	0	0	0
Dakota Mermis	2	0	0	0	−1	0

Playoffs
Player	GP	G	A	Pts	+/−	PIM
Ryan Hartman	5	2	3	5	+3	16
Mats Zuccarello	6	2	3	5	−2	4
Gustav Nyquist	6	0	5	5	+4	2
John Klingberg	4	1	3	4	+2	0
Frederick Gaudreau	6	3	0	3	0	4
Matthew Boldy	6	0	3	3	−5	4
Marcus Johansson	6	2	0	2	−5	0
Sam Steel	5	1	1	2	+1	2
Jacob Middleton	6	0	2	2	−2	8
Matt Dumba	6	0	2	2	0	4
Jared Spurgeon	6	0	2	2	−6	4
Kirill Kaprizov	6	1	0	1	−3	12
Oskar Sundqvist	1	1	0	1	+2	0
Marcus Foligno	6	1	0	1	−1	35
Brock Faber	6	0	0	0	+3	0
Connor Dewar	6	0	0	0	−2	0
Brandon Duhaime	6	0	0	0	−2	10
Joel Eriksson Ek	1	0	0	0	0	0
Jonas Brodin	6	0	0	0	+1	0
Jon Merrill	2	0	0	0	+1	2
Ryan Reaves	6	0	0	0	−1	14

=== Goaltenders ===
Regular season
Player	GP	GS	TOI	W	L	OT	GA	GAA	SA	SV%	SO	G	A	PIM
Marc-Andre Fleury	46	45	2,654:17	24	16	4	126	2.85	1,367	.908	2	0	1	2
Filip Gustavsson	39	37	2,310:56	22	9	7	81	2.10	1,173	.931	3	0	1	0

Playoffs
Player	GP	GS	TOI	W	L	GA	GAA	SA	SV%	SO	G	A	PIM
Filip Gustavsson	5	5	308:32	2	3	12	2.33	151	.921	0	0	0	0
Marc-Andre Fleury	2	1	76:41	0	1	7	5.48	37	.811	0	0	0	0

^{†}Denotes player spent time with another team before joining the Wild. Stats reflect time with the Wild only.
^{‡}Denotes player was traded mid-season. Stats reflect time with the Wild only.
Bold/italics denotes franchise record.

== Transactions ==
The Wild have been involved in the following transactions during the 2022–23 season.

Key:

† Contract is entry-level.
‡ Contract initially takes effect in the 2023–24 season.

=== Trades ===
Date	Details		Ref
July 12, 2022	To Ottawa Senators Cam Talbot	To Minnesota Wild Filip Gustavsson	
August 31, 2022	To Anaheim Ducks Dmitry Kulikov	To Minnesota Wild Future considerations	
November 23, 2022	To New York Rangers 5th-round pick in 2025	To Minnesota Wild Ryan Reaves	
February 17, 2023	To St. Louis Blues Josh Pillar	To Minnesota Wild Ryan O'Reilly	
February 17, 2023	To Toronto Maple Leafs Ryan O'Reilly	To Minnesota Wild 4th-round pick in 2025	
March 3, 2023	To Anaheim Ducks Nikita Nesterenko; Andrej Sustr; 4th-round pick in 2025	To Minnesota Wild John Klingberg*	
March 3, 2023	To Buffalo Sabres Jordan Greenway	To Minnesota Wild VGK 2nd-round pick in 2023; 5th-round pick in 2024	
March 3, 2023	To Detroit Red Wings 5th-round pick in 2023	To Minnesota Wild Oskar Sundqvist	

=== Players acquired ===
Date	Player	Former team	Term	Via	Ref
July 13, 2022	Brandon Baddock	Montreal Canadiens	1-year	Free agency	
July 13, 2022	Steven Fogarty	Boston Bruins	2-year	Free agency	
July 13, 2022	Nic Petan	Vancouver Canucks	2-year	Free agency	
July 13, 2022	Andrej Sustr	Anaheim Ducks	1-year	Free agency	
August 17, 2022	Samuel Walker	Minnesota Golden Gophers (B1G)	2-year†	Free agency	
August 30, 2022	Sam Steel	Anaheim Ducks	1-year	Free agency	

=== Players lost ===
Date	Player	New team	Term	Via	Ref
July 13, 2022	Nick Bjugstad	Arizona Coyotes	1-year	Free agency	
July 13, 2022	Nicolas Deslauriers	Philadelphia Flyers	4-year	Free agency	
July 14, 2022	Jordie Benn	Toronto Maple Leafs	1-year	Free agency	
July 15, 2022	Jon Lizotte	Wilkes-Barre/Scranton Penguins (AHL)	1-year	Free agency	
July 18, 2022	Fedor Gordeev	Providence Bruins (AHL)	1-year	Free agency	
July 18, 2022	Nolan Stevens	Utica Comets (AHL)	1-year	Free agency	
August 12, 2022	Dominic Turgeon	Porin Ässät (Liiga)	1-year	Free agency	
October 24, 2022	Kyle Rau	Abbotsford Canucks (AHL)	1-year	Free agency	
November 19, 2022	Tyson Jost	Buffalo Sabres		Waivers	

=== Signings ===
Date	Player	Term	Ref
July 7, 2022	Marc-Andre Fleury	2-year	
July 11, 2022	Zane McIntyre	1-year	
July 16, 2022	Liam Ohgren	3-year†	
July 17, 2022	Mitchell Chaffee	1-year	
July 17, 2022	Nick Swaney	1-year	
October 19, 2022	Michael Milne	3-year†	
January 16, 2023	Matt Boldy	7-year‡	
March 1, 2023	Caedan Bankier	3-year†‡	
March 2, 2023	Hunter Haight	3-year†‡	
March 6, 2023	David Spacek	3-year†‡	
March 9, 2023	Kyle Masters	3-year†‡	
April 9, 2023	Brock Faber	3-year†	
April 13, 2023	Frederick Gaudreau	5-year‡	
May 2, 2023	Marcus Johansson	2-year‡	
June 23, 2023	Hunter Jones	1-year‡	

== Draft picks ==
Below are the Minnesota Wild's selections at the 2022 NHL entry draft, which was held on July 7 to 8, 2022, at Bell Centre in Montreal.

Round	#	Player	Pos.	Nationality	Team (League)
1	19	Liam Ohgren	LW	Sweden	Djurgårdens IF (SHL)
1	24	Danila Yurov	C	Russia	Metallurg Magnitogorsk (KHL)
2	47	Hunter Haight	C	Canada	Barrie Colts (OHL)
2	56	Rieger Lorenz	LW	Canada	Okotoks Oilers (AJHL)
3	89	Michael Milne	LW	Canada	Winnipeg Ice (WHL)
4	121	Ryan Healey	D	USA	Sioux Falls Stampede (USHL)
5	153	David Spacek	D	Czech Republic	Sherbrooke Phoenix (QMJHL)
6	185	Servac Petrovsky	C	Slovakia	Owen Sound Attack (OHL)
