= 2022–23 Pittsburgh Penguins season =

National Hockey League season

2022–23 Pittsburgh Penguins
- Division: 5th Metropolitan
- Conference: 9th Eastern
- 2022–23 record: 40–31–11
- Home record: 23–13–5
- Road record: 17–18–6
- Goals for: 262
- Goals against: 264

Team information
- General manager: Ron Hextall
- Coach: Mike Sullivan
- Captain: Sidney Crosby
- Alternate captains: Kris Letang; Evgeni Malkin
- Arena: PPG Paints Arena
- Average attendance: 17,816
- Minor league affiliates: Wilkes-Barre/Scranton Penguins (AHL); Wheeling Nailers (ECHL)

Team leaders
- Goals: Jake Guentzel (36)
- Assists: Sidney Crosby (60)
- Points: Sidney Crosby (93)
- Penalty minutes: Evgeni Malkin (82)
- Plus/minus: Sidney Crosby; Pierre-Olivier Joseph (+8)
- Wins: Tristan Jarry (24)
- Goals against average: Tristan Jarry (2.90)

The 2022–23 Pittsburgh Penguins season was the 56th season for the National Hockey League team that was established on June 5, 1967.

During the season Evgeni Malkin and Kris Letang each played in their 1,000th NHL game, joining Sidney Crosby as the only players in franchise history to accomplish this feat while playing all 1,000 games for the Penguins.

They were eliminated from playoff contention on April 12, 2023 after the New York Islanders defeated the Montreal Canadiens, missing the postseason for the first time since the 2005–06 season, and ending the longest active playoff appearance streak among the four major North American sports leagues at 16 years. Consequently, the Los Angeles Dodgers of Major League Baseball (MLB), making the playoffs every year since 2013, now owned the longest active playoffs streak across four major North American professional sports while the New York Red Bulls of Major League Soccer (MLS) do the same in all five North American professional sports, making the playoffs every year since 2010. Meanwhile, the Boston Bruins and the Toronto Maple Leafs now own the longest active playoffs streaks in the NHL, both at 7 years after both the Nashville Predators and Washington Capitals, both had eight straight playoff berths, missed out.

== Standings ==
=== Divisional standings ===
Metropolitan Division
Pos	Team	GP	W	L	OTL	RW	GF	GA	GD	Pts
1	y – Carolina Hurricanes	82	52	21	9	39	266	213	+53	113
2	x – New Jersey Devils	82	52	22	8	39	291	226	+65	112
3	x – New York Rangers	82	47	22	13	37	277	219	+58	107
4	x – New York Islanders	82	42	31	9	36	243	222	+21	93
5	Pittsburgh Penguins	82	40	31	11	31	262	264	−2	91
6	Washington Capitals	82	35	37	10	27	255	265	−10	80
7	Philadelphia Flyers	82	31	38	13	26	222	277	−55	75
8	Columbus Blue Jackets	82	25	48	9	15	214	330	−116	59

Source: National Hockey League
Rules for classification: 1) Fewer number of games played (GP, only during regular season); 2) Greater number of regulation wins (RW); 3) Greater number of wins in regulation and overtime, excluding shootout wins (ROW); 4) Greater number of total wins, including shootouts (W); 5) Greater number of points earned in head-to-head play; if teams played an uneven number of head-to-head games, the result of the first game on the home ice of the team with the extra home game is discarded; 6) Greater goal differential (GD); 7) Greater number of goals scored (GF)
x – Clinched playoff spot; y – Clinched division

=== Conference standings ===
Eastern Conference Wild Card
Pos	Div	Team	GP	W	L	OTL	RW	GF	GA	GD	Pts
1	ME	x – New York Islanders	82	42	31	9	36	243	222	+21	93
2	AT	x – Florida Panthers	82	42	32	8	36	290	273	+17	92
3	ME	Pittsburgh Penguins	82	40	31	11	31	262	264	−2	91
4	AT	Buffalo Sabres	82	42	33	7	30	296	300	−4	91
5	AT	Ottawa Senators	82	39	35	8	31	261	271	−10	86
6	AT	Detroit Red Wings	82	35	37	10	28	240	279	−39	80
7	ME	Washington Capitals	82	35	37	10	27	255	265	−10	80
8	ME	Philadelphia Flyers	82	31	38	13	26	222	277	−55	75
9	AT	Montreal Canadiens	82	31	45	6	21	232	307	−75	68
10	ME	Columbus Blue Jackets	82	25	48	9	15	214	330	−116	59

Source: National Hockey League
Rules for classification: 1) Fewer number of games played (GP, only during regular season); 2) Greater number of regulation wins (RW); 3) Greater number of wins in regulation and overtime, excluding shootout wins (ROW); 4) Greater number of total wins, including shootouts (W); 5) Greater number of points earned in head-to-head play; if teams played an uneven number of head-to-head games, the result of the first game on the home ice of the team with the extra home game is discarded; 6) Greater goal differential (GD); 7) Greater number of goals scored (GF)
x – Clinched playoff spot

== Schedule and results ==
=== Preseason ===
The Preseason schedule was released on June 30, 2022.

2022 preseason game log: 3–3–0 (Home: 2–1–0; Road: 1–2–0)

#	Date	Visitor	Score	Home	Location	Attendance	Record
1^{A}	September 25	Columbus	2–3 OT	Pittsburgh	PPG Paints Arena	17,805	1–0–0
2^{A}	September 25	Pittsburgh	1–5	Columbus	Nationwide Arena	14,308	1–1–0
3	September 27	Detroit	6–2	Pittsburgh	PPG Paints Arena	13,020	1–2–0
4	October 1	Pittsburgh	1–3	Buffalo	KeyBank Center	10,908	1–3–0
5	October 3	Pittsburgh	3–2	Detroit	Little Caesars Arena	13,328	2–3–0
6	October 7	Buffalo	1–7	Pittsburgh	PPG Paints Arena	14,350	3–3–0

Legend: = Win = Loss = OT/SO Loss

^{A} – Split Squad

=== Regular season ===
The regular season schedule was released on July 6, 2022.

2022–23 game log
October: 4–4–1 (home: 3–0–0; road: 1–4–1)

#	Date	Visitor	Score	Home	Arena	Attendance	Record	Points
1	October 13	Arizona Coyotes	2–6	Pittsburgh Penguins	PPG Paints Arena	18,355	1–0–0	2
2	October 15	Tampa Bay Lightning	2–6	Pittsburgh Penguins	PPG Paints Arena	18,416	2–0–0	4
3	October 17	Pittsburgh Penguins	2–3 (OT)	Montreal Canadiens	Bell Centre	21,105	2–0–1	5
4	October 20	Los Angeles Kings	1–6	Pittsburgh Penguins	PPG Paints Arena	17,136	3–0–1	7
5	October 22	Pittsburgh Penguins	6–3	Columbus Blue Jackets	Nationwide Arena	18,051	4–0–1	9
6	October 24	Pittsburgh Penguins	3–6	Edmonton Oilers	Rogers Place	17,392	4–1–1	9
7	October 25	Pittsburgh Penguins	1–4	Calgary Flames	Scotiabank Saddledome	17,628	4–2–1	9
8	October 28	Pittsburgh Penguins	1–5	Vancouver Canucks	Rogers Arena	18,528	4–3–1	9
9	October 29	Pittsburgh Penguins	1–3	Seattle Kraken	Climate Pledge Arena	17,151	4–4–1	9

November: 6–4–3 (home: 1–3–2; road: 5–1–1)

#	Date	Visitor	Score	Home	Arena	Attendance	Record	Points
10	November 1	Boston Bruins	6–5 (OT)	Pittsburgh Penguins	PPG Paints Arena	17,629	4–4–2	10
11	November 2	Pittsburgh Penguins	3–6	Buffalo Sabres	KeyBank Center	12,201	4–5–2	10
12	November 5	Seattle Kraken	3–2	Pittsburgh Penguins	PPG Paints Arena	18,302	4–6–2	10
13	November 9	Pittsburgh Penguins	4–1	Washington Capitals	Capital One Arena	18,573	5–6–2	12
14	November 11	Pittsburgh Penguins	4–2	Toronto Maple Leafs	Scotiabank Arena	19,229	6–6–2	14
15	November 12	Pittsburgh Penguins	4–5 (OT)	Montreal Canadiens	Bell Centre	21,105	6–6–3	15
16	November 15	Toronto Maple Leafs	5–2	Pittsburgh Penguins	PPG Paints Arena	17,035	6–7–3	15
17	November 17	Pittsburgh Penguins	6–4	Minnesota Wild	Xcel Energy Center	18,224	7–7–3	17
18	November 19	Pittsburgh Penguins	3–0	Winnipeg Jets	Canada Life Centre	15,325	8–7–3	19
19	November 20	Pittsburgh Penguins	5–3	Chicago Blackhawks	United Center	21,182	9–7–3	21
20	November 23	Calgary Flames	1–2 (SO)	Pittsburgh Penguins	PPG Paints Arena	18,149	10–7–3	23
21	November 25	Pittsburgh Penguins	4–1	Philadelphia Flyers	Wells Fargo Center	19,309	11–7–3	25
22	November 26	Toronto Maple Leafs	4–1	Pittsburgh Penguins	PPG Paints Arena	18,166	11–8–3	25
23	November 29	Carolina Hurricanes	3–2 (OT)	Pittsburgh Penguins	PPG Paints Arena	15,942	11–8–4	26

December: 8–3–2 (home: 6–1–2; road: 2–2–0)

#	Date	Visitor	Score	Home	Arena	Attendance	Record	Points
24	December 1	Vegas Golden Knights	3–4	Pittsburgh Penguins	PPG Paints Arena	15,895	12–8–4	28
25	December 3	St. Louis Blues	2–6	Pittsburgh Penguins	PPG Paints Arena	17,330	13–8–4	30
26	December 6	Columbus Blue Jackets	1–4	Pittsburgh Penguins	PPG Paints Arena	15,867	14–8–4	32
27	December 9	Pittsburgh Penguins	4–3 (OT)	Buffalo Sabres	KeyBank Center	17,205	15–8–4	34
28	December 10	Buffalo Sabres	1–3	Pittsburgh Penguins	PPG Paints Arena	18,414	16–8–4	36
29	December 12	Dallas Stars	1–2	Pittsburgh Penguins	PPG Paints Arena	17,147	17–8–4	38
30	December 15	Pittsburgh Penguins	4–2	Florida Panthers	Amerant Bank Arena	14,538	18–8–4	40
31	December 18	Pittsburgh Penguins	2–3	Carolina Hurricanes	PNC Arena	18,117	18–9–4	40
32	December 20	New York Rangers	2–3	Pittsburgh Penguins	PPG Paints Arena	18,005	19–9–4	42
33	December 22	Carolina Hurricanes	4–3 (OT)	Pittsburgh Penguins	PPG Paints Arena	18,075	19–9–5	43
34	December 27	Pittsburgh Penguins	1–5	New York Islanders	UBS Arena	17,255	19–10–5	43
35	December 28	Detroit Red Wings	5–4 (OT)	Pittsburgh Penguins	PPG Paints Arena	18,387	19–10–6	44
36	December 30	New Jersey Devils	4–2	Pittsburgh Penguins	PPG Paints Arena	18,387	19–11–6	44

January: 5–5–3 (home: 4–2–0; road: 1–3–3)

#	Date	Visitor	Score	Home	Arena	Attendance	Record	Points
37	January 2	Pittsburgh Penguins	1–2	Boston Bruins	TD Garden	39,243	19–12–6	44
38	January 5	Pittsburgh Penguins	2–5	Vegas Golden Knights	T-Mobile Arena	18,149	19–13–6	44
39	January 8	Pittsburgh Penguins	4–1	Arizona Coyotes	Mullett Arena	4,600	20–13–6	46
40	January 10	Vancouver Canucks	4–5	Pittsburgh Penguins	PPG Paints Arena	17,986	21–13–6	48
41	January 13	Winnipeg Jets	4–1	Pittsburgh Penguins	PPG Paints Arena	18,268	21–14–6	48
42	January 14	Pittsburgh Penguins	1–2	Carolina Hurricanes	PNC Arena	18,769	21–15–6	48
43	January 16	Anaheim Ducks	3–4 (OT)	Pittsburgh Penguins	PPG Paints Arena	17,784	22–15–6	50
44	January 18	Pittsburgh Penguins	4–5 (OT)	Ottawa Senators	Canadian Tire Centre	17,106	22–15–7	51
45	January 20	Ottawa Senators	1–4	Pittsburgh Penguins	PPG Paints Arena	18,237	23–15–7	53
46	January 22	Pittsburgh Penguins	1–2 (OT)	New Jersey Devils	Prudential Center	16,514	23–15–8	54
47	January 24	Florida Panthers	6–7 (OT)	Pittsburgh Penguins	PPG Paints Arena	17,159	24–15–8	56
48	January 26	Pittsburgh Penguins	2–3 (SO)	Washington Capitals	Capital One Arena	18,573	24–15–9	57
49	January 28	San Jose Sharks	6–4	Pittsburgh Penguins	PPG Paints Arena	18,417	24–16–9	57

February: 6–5–0 (home: 2–3–0; road: 4–2–0)

#	Date	Visitor	Score	Home	Arena	Attendance	Record	Points
50	February 7	Colorado Avalanche	1–2 (OT)	Pittsburgh Penguins	PPG Paints Arena	18,096	25–16–9	59
51	February 10	Pittsburgh Penguins	6–3	Anaheim Ducks	Honda Center	15,026	26–16–9	61
52	February 11	Pittsburgh Penguins	0–6	Los Angeles Kings	Crypto.com Arena	18,230	26–17–9	61
53	February 14	Pittsburgh Penguins	3–1	San Jose Sharks	SAP Center at San Jose	13,534	27–17–9	63
54	February 17	Pittsburgh Penguins	4–5	New York Islanders	UBS Arena	17,255	27–18–9	63
55	February 18	New Jersey Devils	5–2	Pittsburgh Penguins	PPG Paints Arena	18,427	27–19–9	63
56	February 20	New York Islanders	4–2	Pittsburgh Penguins	PPG Paints Arena	18,094	27–20–9	63
57	February 23	Edmonton Oilers	7–2	Pittsburgh Penguins	PPG Paints Arena	18,400	27–21–9	63
58	February 25	Pittsburgh Penguins	3–2 (OT)	St. Louis Blues	Enterprise Center	18,096	28–21–9	65
59	February 26	Tampa Bay Lightning	3–7	Pittsburgh Penguins	PPG Paints Arena	17,691	29–21–9	67
60	February 28	Pittsburgh Penguins	3–1	Nashville Predators	Bridgestone Arena	17,435	30–21–9	69

March: 7–7–1 (home: 5–2–1; road: 2–5–0)

#	Date	Visitor	Score	Home	Arena	Attendance	Record	Points
61	March 2	Pittsburgh Penguins	5–4 (OT)	Tampa Bay Lightning	Amalie Arena	19,092	31–21–9	71
62	March 4	Pittsburgh Penguins	1–4	Florida Panthers	Amerant Bank Arena	16,581	31–22–9	71
63	March 7	Columbus Blue Jackets	4–5 (OT)	Pittsburgh Penguins	PPG Paints Arena	17,400	32–22–9	73
64	March 9	New York Islanders	4–3 (OT)	Pittsburgh Penguins	PPG Paints Arena	17,557	32–22–10	74
65	March 11	Philadelphia Flyers	1–5	Pittsburgh Penguins	PPG Paints Arena	18,254	33–22–10	76
66	March 12	New York Rangers	2–3 (OT)	Pittsburgh Penguins	PPG Paints Arena	18,364	34–22–10	78
67	March 14	Montreal Canadiens	6–4	Pittsburgh Penguins	PPG Paints Arena	17,185	34–23–10	78
68	March 16	Pittsburgh Penguins	2–4	New York Rangers	Madison Square Garden	18,006	34–24–10	78
69	March 18	Pittsburgh Penguins	0–6	New York Rangers	Madison Square Garden	18,006	34–25–10	78
70	March 20	Ottawa Senators	2–1	Pittsburgh Penguins	PPG Paints Arena	17,080	34–26–10	78
71	March 22	Pittsburgh Penguins	5–2	Colorado Avalanche	Ball Arena	18,130	35–26–10	80
72	March 23	Pittsburgh Penguins	2–3	Dallas Stars	American Airlines Center	18,532	35–27–10	80
73	March 25	Washington Capitals	3–4	Pittsburgh Penguins	PPG Paints Arena	18,456	36–27–10	82
74	March 28	Pittsburgh Penguins	4–7	Detroit Red Wings	Little Caesars Arena	19,353	36–28–10	82
75	March 30	Nashville Predators	0–2	Pittsburgh Penguins	PPG Paints Arena	17,482	37–28–10	84

April: 3–3–1 (home: 2–2–0; road: 1–1–1)

#	Date	Visitor	Score	Home	Arena	Attendance	Record	Points
76	April 1	Boston Bruins	4–3	Pittsburgh Penguins	PPG Paints Arena	18,322	37–29–10	84
77	April 2	Philadelphia Flyers	2–4	Pittsburgh Penguins	PPG Paints Arena	18,310	38–29–10	86
78	April 4	Pittsburgh Penguins	1–5	New Jersey Devils	Prudential Center	16,514	38–30–10	86
79	April 6	Minnesota Wild	1–4	Pittsburgh Penguins	PPG Paints Arena	18,417	39–30–10	88
80	April 8	Pittsburgh Penguins	5–1	Detroit Red Wings	Little Caesars Arena	19,515	40–30–10	90
81	April 11	Chicago Blackhawks	5–2	Pittsburgh Penguins	PPG Paints Arena	18,435	40–31–10	90
82	April 13	Pittsburgh Penguins	2–3 (OT)	Columbus Blue Jackets	Nationwide Arena	18,369	40–31–11	91

Legend: = Win = Loss = OT/SO Loss

== Player statistics ==
Skaters

Regular season
Player	GP	G	A	Pts	+/−	PIM
Sidney Crosby	82	33	60	93	8	52
Evgeni Malkin	82	27	56	83	-12	82
Jake Guentzel	78	36	37	73	2	46
Rickard Rakell	82	28	32	60	-5	16
Jason Zucker	78	27	21	48	-4	47
Bryan Rust	81	20	26	46	-4	31
Kris Letang	64	12	29	41	-13	30
Jeff Petry	61	5	26	31	2	24
Jeff Carter	79	13	16	29	-16	30
Brian Dumoulin	82	1	24	25	-4	16
Marcus Pettersson	68	1	23	24	4	58
Danton Heinen	65	8	14	22	-5	12
Pierre-Olivier Joseph	75	5	16	21	8	44
Kasperi Kapanen^{‡}	43	7	13	20	-8	8
Brock McGinn^{‡}	60	10	6	16	0	21
Ryan Poehling	53	7	7	14	-2	8
Josh Archibald	62	6	6	12	6	43
Drew O'Connor	46	5	6	11	-3	12
Teddy Blueger^{‡}	45	2	8	10	-7	16
Jan Rutta	56	3	6	9	3	30
Mikael Granlund^{†}	21	1	4	5	1	8
Chad Ruhwedel	47	1	4	5	-4	18
Ty Smith	9	1	3	4	3	4
Mark Friedman	23	1	2	3	2	15
Alexander Nylander	9	1	1	2	1	6
Sam Poulin	3	0	1	1	-3	2
Dmitry Kulikov^{†}	6	0	1	1	-2	4
Filip Hallander	2	0	0	0	0	0
Nick Bonino^{†}	3	0	0	0	1	0
Jonathan Gruden	3	0	0	0	0	0
Taylor Fedun	4	0	0	0	0	0
Drake Caggiula	4	0	0	0	-1	0
Total		261	448	709	—	683

Goaltenders

Regular season
Player	GP	GS	TOI	W	L	OT	T	GA	GAA	SA	SV%	SO	G	A	PIM
Tristan Jarry	47	47	2650:02	24	13	7	128	2.9	1414	0.909	2	0	2	2	
Casey DeSmith	38	33	2065:57	15	16	4	109	3.17	1142	0.905	0	0	0	2	
Dustin Tokarski	4	2	209:24	1	2	0	12	3.44	117	0.897	0	0	0	0	
Total		82	4925:23	40	31	11	249	3.03	2673	0.907	2	0	2	4	

^{†}Denotes player spent time with another team before joining the Penguins. Stats reflect time with the Penguins only.
^{‡}Denotes player was traded mid-season. Stats reflect time with the Penguins only.

== Awards and records ==
- Evgeni Malkin set the franchise record for career penalty minutes (1090). He broke the previous high of 1048 set by Kevin Stevens in 2002.

== Transactions ==
The Penguins have been involved in the following transactions during the 2022–23 season.

Key:

† Contract is entry-level.
‡ Contract initially takes effect in the 2023–24 season.

=== Trades ===
Date	Details		Ref
July 8, 2022	To Chicago Blackhawks Liam Gorman	To Pittsburgh Penguins 6th-round pick in 2022	
July 8, 2022	To Florida Panthers 7th-round pick in 2022	To Pittsburgh Penguins 7th-round pick in 2023	
July 16, 2022	To New Jersey Devils John Marino	To Pittsburgh Penguins Ty Smith; 3rd-round pick in 2023	
July 16, 2022	To Montreal Canadiens Mike Matheson; 4th-round pick in 2023	To Pittsburgh Penguins Jeff Petry; Ryan Poehling	
March 1, 2023	To Nashville Predators 2nd-round pick in 2023	To Pittsburgh Penguins Mikael Granlund	
March 1, 2023	To Vegas Golden Knights Teddy Blueger	To Pittsburgh Penguins Peter DiLiberatore; 3rd-round pick in 2024	
March 3, 2023	To Anaheim Ducks Brock McGinn; 3rd-round pick in 2024	To Pittsburgh Penguins Dmitry Kulikov^{1}	
March 3, 2023	To Montreal Canadiens Tony Sund; SJS 5th-round pick in 2024	To Pittsburgh Penguins Nick Bonino^{2}	
March 3, 2023	To San Jose Sharks Arvid Henriksson; Conditional 5th-round pick in 2024; PIT 7th-round pick in 2023	To Pittsburgh Penguins Nick Bonino^{2}	
March 31, 2023	To Anaheim Ducks Judd Caulfield	To Pittsburgh Penguins Thimo Nickl	

Notes:

1. Anaheim retains 50% of Kulikov's remaining contract.
2. Montreal retains 50% of Bonino's remaining contract.

=== Players acquired ===
Date	Player	Former team	Term	Via	Ref
July 13, 2022	Josh Archibald	Edmonton Oilers	1-year	Free agency	
July 13, 2022	Drake Caggiula	Buffalo Sabres	1-year	Free agency	
July 13, 2022	Xavier Ouellet	Montreal Canadiens	2-year	Free agency	
July 13, 2022	Jan Rutta	Tampa Bay Lightning	3-year	Free agency	
July 13, 2022	Dustin Tokarski	Buffalo Sabres	1-year	Free agency	
August 20, 2022	Jack St. Ivany	Boston College Eagles (HE)	2-year†	Free agency	

=== Players lost ===
Date	Player	New team	Term	Via	Ref
July 13, 2022	Louis Domingue	New York Rangers	2-year	Free agency	
July 14, 2022	Anthony Angello	St. Louis Blues	1-year	Free agency	
August 22, 2022	Jordy Bellerive	Lehigh Valley Phantoms (AHL)	1-year	Free agency	
September 2, 2022	Alex D'Orio	IF Björklöven (HockeyAllsvenskan)	1-year	Free agency	
September 12, 2022	Evan Rodrigues	Colorado Avalanche	1-year	Free agency	
September 25, 2022	Michael Chaput	Barys Astana (KHL)	1-year	Free agency	
October 1, 2022	Nathan Beaulieu	Anaheim Ducks	1-year	Free agency	
October 3, 2022	Radim Zohorna	Calgary Flames		Waivers	
February 25, 2023	Kasperi Kapanen	St. Louis Blues		Waivers	
April 28, 2023	Filip Hallander	Timrå IK (SHL)	5-year‡	Free agency	
May 5, 2023	Filip Lindberg	TPS (Liiga)	2-year‡	Free agency	

=== Signings ===
Date	Player	Term	Ref
July 7, 2022	Kris Letang	6-year	
July 11, 2022	Alexander Nylander	1-year	
July 11, 2022	Rickard Rakell	6-year	
July 12, 2022	Pierre-Olivier Joseph	2-year	
July 12, 2022	Evgeni Malkin	4-year	
July 16, 2022	Owen Pickering	3-year†	
July 21, 2022	Kasperi Kapanen	2-year	
July 27, 2022	Danton Heinen	1-year	
March 1, 2023	Isaac Belliveau	3-year†‡	
April 5, 2023	Joel Blomqvist	3-year†‡	
April 29, 2023	Alexander Nylander	1-year‡	
June 20, 2023	Valtteri Puustinen	1-year‡	

== Draft Picks ==
Below are the Pittsburgh Penguins' selections at the 2022 NHL entry draft, which was held on July 7 to 8, 2022, at Bell Centre in Montreal.

Round	#	Player	Pos.	Nationality	Team (League)
1	21	Owen Pickering	D	Canada	Swift Current Broncos (WHL)
4	118	Sergei Murashov	G	Russia	Loko Yaroslavl (MHL)
5	150	Zam Plante	C	USA	Chicago Steel (USHL)
6	167	Nolan Collins	D	Canada	Sudbury Wolves (OHL)
6	182	Luke Devlin	C	USA	St. Andrew's College (CAHS)
