= 2022–23 Nashville Predators season =

National Hockey League season

2022–23 Nashville Predators
- Division: 5th Central
- Conference: 10th Western
- 2022–23 record: 42–32–8
- Home record: 22–15–4
- Road record: 20–17–4
- Goals for: 229
- Goals against: 238

Team information
- General manager: Barry Trotz
- Coach: Andrew Brunette
- Captain: Roman Josi
- Alternate captains: Mattias Ekholm (Oct. 7 – Feb. 28); Filip Forsberg; Mikael Granlund (Oct. 7 – Mar. 1); Ryan Johansen
- Arena: Bridgestone Arena
- Average attendance: 17,361
- Minor league affiliate: Milwaukee Admirals (AHL)

Team leaders
- Goals: Matt Duchene (22)
- Assists: Roman Josi (41)
- Points: Roman Josi (59)
- Penalty minutes: Tanner Jeannot (85)
- Plus/minus: Ryan McDonagh (+12)
- Wins: Juuse Saros (33)
- Goals against average: Juuse Saros (2.69)

The 2022–23 Nashville Predators season was the 25th season for the National Hockey League (NHL) franchise that was established on June 25, 1997. The Predators were eliminated from playoff contention after the Winnipeg Jets defeated the Minnesota Wild on April 11, 2023, and missed the playoffs for the first time since the 2013–14 season.

== Standings ==
=== Divisional standings ===
Central Division
Pos	Team	GP	W	L	OTL	RW	GF	GA	GD	Pts
1	y – Colorado Avalanche	82	51	24	7	36	280	226	+54	109
2	x – Dallas Stars	82	47	21	14	39	285	218	+67	108
3	x – Minnesota Wild	82	46	25	11	34	246	225	+21	103
4	x – Winnipeg Jets	82	46	33	3	36	247	225	+22	95
5	Nashville Predators	82	42	32	8	29	229	238	−9	92
6	St. Louis Blues	82	37	38	7	27	263	301	−38	81
7	Arizona Coyotes	82	28	40	14	20	228	299	−71	70
8	Chicago Blackhawks	82	26	49	7	18	204	301	−97	59

Source: National Hockey League
Rules for classification: 1) Fewer number of games played (GP, only during regular season); 2) Greater number of regulation wins (RW); 3) Greater number of wins in regulation and overtime, excluding shootout wins (ROW); 4) Greater number of total wins, including shootouts (W); 5) Greater number of points earned in head-to-head play; if teams played an uneven number of head-to-head games, the result of the first game on the home ice of the team with the extra home game is discarded; 6) Greater goal differential (GD); 7) Greater number of goals scored (GF)
x – Clinched playoff spot; y – Clinched division

=== Conference standings ===
Western Conference Wild Card
Pos	Div	Team	GP	W	L	OTL	RW	GF	GA	GD	Pts
1	PA	x – Seattle Kraken	82	46	28	8	37	289	256	+33	100
2	CE	x – Winnipeg Jets	82	46	33	3	36	247	225	+22	95
3	PA	Calgary Flames	82	38	27	17	31	260	252	+8	93
4	CE	Nashville Predators	82	42	32	8	29	229	238	−9	92
5	PA	Vancouver Canucks	82	38	37	7	24	276	298	−22	83
6	CE	St. Louis Blues	82	37	38	7	27	263	301	−38	81
7	CE	Arizona Coyotes	82	28	40	14	20	228	299	−71	70
8	PA	San Jose Sharks	82	22	44	16	16	234	321	−87	60
9	CE	Chicago Blackhawks	82	26	49	7	18	204	301	−97	59
10	PA	Anaheim Ducks	82	23	47	12	13	209	338	−129	58

Source: National Hockey League
Rules for classification: 1) Fewer number of games played (GP, only during regular season); 2) Greater number of regulation wins (RW); 3) Greater number of wins in regulation and overtime, excluding shootout wins (ROW); 4) Greater number of total wins, including shootouts (W); 5) Greater number of points earned in head-to-head play; if teams played an uneven number of head-to-head games, the result of the first game on the home ice of the team with the extra home game is discarded; 6) Greater goal differential (GD); 7) Greater number of goals scored (GF)
x – Clinched playoff spot

== Regular season ==
2022–23 game log
October: 3–5–1 (home: 2–3–1; road: 1–2–0)

Game	Date	Opponent	Score	OT	Decision	Location	Attendance	Record	Points	Recap
1	October 7	San Jose Sharks	4–1		Saros	O2 Arena	16,648	1–0–0	2	
2	October 8	@ San Jose Sharks	3–2		Lankinen	O2 Arena	17,023	2–0–0	4	
3	October 13	Dallas Stars	1–4		Saros	Bridgestone Arena	17,692	2–1–0	4	
4	October 15	@ Dallas Stars	1–5		Saros	American Airlines Center	18,532	2–2–0	4	
5	October 18	Los Angeles Kings	3–4	SO	Saros	Bridgestone Arena	17,159	2–2–1	5	
6	October 20	@ Columbus Blue Jackets	3–5		Lankinen	Nationwide Arena	14,691	2–3–1	5	
7	October 22	Philadelphia Flyers	1–3		Saros	Bridgestone Arena	17,470	2–4–1	5	
8	October 27	St. Louis Blues	6–2		Saros	Bridgestone Arena	17,159	3–4–1	7	
9	October 29	Washington Capitals	0–3		Saros	Bridgestone Arena	17,159	3–5–1	7	

November: 7–4–1 (home: 5–0–1; road: 2–4–0)

Game	Date	Opponent	Score	OT	Decision	Location	Attendance	Record	Points	Recap
10	November 1	@ Edmonton Oilers	4–7		Saros	Rogers Place	16,812	3–6–1	7	
11	November 3	@ Calgary Flames	4–1		Lankinen	Scotiabank Saddledome	16,984	4–6–1	9	
12	November 5	@ Vancouver Canucks	4–3	SO	Saros	Rogers Arena	18,855	5–6–1	11	
13	November 8	@ Seattle Kraken	1–5		Saros	Climate Pledge Arena	17,151	5–7–1	11	
14	November 10	@ Colorado Avalanche	3–5		Lankinen	Ball Arena	18,134	5–8–1	11	
15	November 12	New York Rangers	2–1		Saros	Bridgestone Arena	17,169	6–8–1	13	
16	November 15	Minnesota Wild	2–1		Saros	Bridgestone Arena	17,159	7–8–1	15	
17	November 17	New York Islanders	5–4		Saros	Bridgestone Arena	17,159	8–8–1	17	
18	November 19	Tampa Bay Lightning	2–3	OT	Saros	Bridgestone Arena	17,444	8–8–2	18	
19	November 21	Arizona Coyotes	4–3	SO	Saros	Bridgestone Arena	17,159	9–8–2	20	
20	November 23	@ Detroit Red Wings	0–3		Lankinen	Little Caesars Arena	19,515	9–9–2	20	
—	November 25	Colorado Avalanche	Postponed due to a water main break at Bridgestone Arena. Moved to April 14.							
—	November 26	Columbus Blue Jackets	Postponed due to a water main break at Bridgestone Arena. Moved to January 17.							
21	November 29	Anaheim Ducks	2–1	OT	Saros	Bridgestone Arena	17,159	10–9–2	22	

December: 5–5–4 (home: 1–3–1; road: 4–2–3)

Game	Date	Opponent	Score	OT	Decision	Location	Attendance	Record	Points	Recap
22	December 1	@ New Jersey Devils	4–3	OT	Saros	Prudential Center	14,071	11–9–2	24	
23	December 2	@ New York Islanders	4–1		Lankinen	UBS Arena	16,263	12–9–2	26	
24	December 8	@ Tampa Bay Lightning	2–5		Saros	Amalie Arena	19,092	12–10–2	26	
25	December 10	Ottawa Senators	2–3		Saros	Bridgestone Arena	17,414	12–11–2	26	
26	December 12	@ St. Louis Blues	0–1	OT	Saros	Enterprise Center	18,096	12–11–3	27	
27	December 13	Edmonton Oilers	3–6		Lankinen	Bridgestone Arena	17,159	12–12–3	27	
28	December 15	@ Winnipeg Jets	1–2	OT	Saros	Canada Life Centre	13,949	12–12–4	28	
29	December 17	@ Colorado Avalanche	1–3		Saros	Ball Arena	18,131	12–13–4	28	
30	December 19	Edmonton Oilers	4–3	OT	Saros	Bridgestone Arena	17,558	13–13–4	30	
31	December 21	@ Chicago Blackhawks	4–2		Saros	United Center	15,239	14–13–4	32	
32	December 23	Colorado Avalanche	2–3	OT	Saros	Bridgestone Arena	17,159	14–13–5	33	
33	December 27	Dallas Stars	2–3		Saros	Bridgestone Arena	17,768	14–14–5	33	
34	December 30	@ Anaheim Ducks	6–1		Saros	Honda Center	14,890	15–14–5	35	
35	December 31	@ Vegas Golden Knights	4–5	OT	Lankinen	T-Mobile Arena	18,333	15–14–6	36	

January: 9–4–0 (home: 6–1–0; road: 3–3–0)

Game	Date	Opponent	Score	OT	Decision	Location	Attendance	Record	Points	Recap
36	January 3	Montreal Canadiens	6–3		Saros	Bridgestone Arena	17,581	16–14–6	38	
37	January 5	@ Carolina Hurricanes	5–3		Saros	PNC Arena	18,344	17–14–6	40	
38	January 6	@ Washington Capitals	3–2		Lankinen	Capital One Arena	18,573	18–14–6	42	
39	January 9	@ Ottawa Senators	3–0		Saros	Canadian Tire Centre	13,362	19–14–6	44	
40	January 11	@ Toronto Maple Leafs	1–2		Saros	Scotiabank Arena	18,638	19–15–6	44	
41	January 12	@ Montreal Canadiens	3–4		Askarov	Bell Centre	21,105	19–16–6	44	
42	January 14	Buffalo Sabres	3–5		Saros	Bridgestone Arena	17,761	19–17–6	44	
43	January 16	Calgary Flames	2–1		Saros	Bridgestone Arena	17,159	20–17–6	46	
44	January 17	Columbus Blue Jackets	2–1		Lankinen	Bridgestone Arena	17,159	21–17–6	48	
45	January 19	@ St. Louis Blues	2–5		Saros	Enterprise Center	18,096	21–18–6	48	
46	January 21	Los Angeles Kings	5–3		Saros	Bridgestone Arena	17,654	22–18–6	50	
47	January 24	Winnipeg Jets	2–1		Saros	Bridgestone Arena	17,159	23–18–6	52	
48	January 26	New Jersey Devils	6–4		Saros	Bridgestone Arena	17,164	24–18–6	54	

February: 5–5–0 (home: 2–4–0; road: 3–1–0)

Game	Date	Opponent	Score	OT	Decision	Location	Attendance	Record	Points	Recap
49	February 7	Vegas Golden Knights	1–5		Saros	Bridgestone Arena	17,159	24–19–6	54	
50	February 11	@ Philadelphia Flyers	2–1	OT	Saros	Wells Fargo Center	19,412	25–19–6	56	
51	February 13	Arizona Coyotes	2–4		Lankinen	Bridgestone Arena	17,159	25–20–6	56	
52	February 16	Boston Bruins	0–5		Saros	Bridgestone Arena	17,159	25–21–6	56	
53	February 18	Florida Panthers	7–3		Lankinen	Bridgestone Arena	17,823	26–21–6	58	
54	February 19	@ Minnesota Wild	3–4		Saros	Xcel Energy Center	19,255	26–22–6	58	
55	February 21	Vancouver Canucks	5–4	SO	Saros	Bridgestone Arena	17,161	27–22–6	60	
56	February 23	@ San Jose Sharks	6–2		Saros	SAP Center	11,320	28–22–6	62	
57	February 26	@ Arizona Coyotes	6–2		Saros	Mullett Arena	4,600	29–22–6	64	
58	February 28	Pittsburgh Penguins	1–3		Saros	Bridgestone Arena	17,435	29–23–6	64	

March: 8–6–2 (home: 2–3–1; road: 6–3–1)

Game	Date	Opponent	Score	OT	Decision	Location	Attendance	Record	Points	Recap
59	March 2	@ Florida Panthers	2–1		Lankinen	FLA Live Arena	16,660	30–23–6	66	
60	March 4	@ Chicago Blackhawks	3–1		Saros	United Center	18,942	31–23–6	68	
61	March 6	@ Vancouver Canucks	3–4	SO	Saros	Rogers Arena	18,525	31–23–7	69	
62	March 9	@ Arizona Coyotes	1–4		Saros	Mullett Arena	4,600	31–24–7	69	
63	March 11	@ Los Angeles Kings	2–1	SO	Lankinen	Crypto.com Arena	18,230	32–24–7	71	
64	March 12	@ Anaheim Ducks	5–4	OT	Saros	Honda Center	15,098	33–24–7	73	
65	March 14	Detroit Red Wings	2–1		Saros	Bridgestone Arena	17,644	34–24–7	75	
66	March 16	Chicago Blackhawks	1–2		Saros	Bridgestone Arena	17,538	34–25–7	75	
67	March 18	Winnipeg Jets	2–3	OT	Saros	Bridgestone Arena	17,402	34–25–8	76	
68	March 19	@ New York Rangers	0–7		Lankinen	Madison Square Garden	18,006	34–26–8	78	
69	March 21	@ Buffalo Sabres	7–3		Saros	KeyBank Center	13,043	35–26–8	78	
70	March 23	Seattle Kraken	2–1	SO	Saros	Bridgestone Arena	17,436	36–26–8	80	
71	March 25	Seattle Kraken	2–7		Saros	Bridgestone Arena	17,335	36–27–8	80	
72	March 26	Toronto Maple Leafs	2–3		Lankinen	Bridgestone Arena	17,411	36–28–8	80	
73	March 28	@ Boston Bruins	2–1		Saros	TD Garden	17,850	37–28–8	82	
74	March 30	@ Pittsburgh Penguins	0–2		Saros	PPG Paints Arena	17,482	37–29–8	82	

April: 5–3–0 (home: 4–1–0; road: 1–2–0)

Game	Date	Opponent	Score	OT	Decision	Location	Attendance	Record	Points	Recap
75	April 1	St. Louis Blues	6–1		Saros	Bridgestone Arena	17,348	38–29–8	84	
76	April 3	@ Dallas Stars	1–5		Saros	American Airlines Center	18,056	38–30–8	84	
77	April 4	Vegas Golden Knights	3–2	OT	Lankinen	Bridgestone Arena	17,420	39–30–8	86	
78	April 6	Carolina Hurricanes	3–0		Saros	Bridgestone Arena	17,762	40–30–8	88	
79	April 8	@ Winnipeg Jets	0–2		Saros	Canada Life Centre	14,075	40–31–8	88	
80	April 10	@ Calgary Flames	3–2	SO	Saros	Scotiabank Saddledome	17,359	41–31–8	90	
81	April 13	Minnesota Wild	4–3	OT	Saros	Bridgestone Arena	17,519	42–31–8	92	
82	April 14	Colorado Avalanche	3–4		Lankinen	Bridgestone Arena	17,159	42–32–8	92	

2022–23 schedule

Win (2 Points) Loss (0 points) Overtime/shootout loss (1 point)

== Player statistics ==
=== Skaters ===
Regular season
Player	GP	G	A	Pts	+/−	PIM
Roman Josi	67	18	41	59	+5	36
Matt Duchene	71	22	34	56	+4	32
Tommy Novak	51	17	26	43	+5	8
Filip Forsberg	50	19	23	42	–4	20
Mikael Granlund^{‡}	58	9	27	36	–16	12
Cody Glass	72	14	21	35	+9	20
Colton Sissons	82	12	18	30	–4	20
Nino Niederreiter^{†}	56	18	10	28	–9	16
Ryan Johansen	55	12	16	28	–13	32
Juuso Parssinen	45	6	19	25	–1	15
Yakov Trenin	77	12	12	24	–7	47
Ryan McDonagh	71	2	18	20	+12	22
Mattias Ekholm^{‡}	57	5	13	18	0	24
Philip Tomasino	31	5	13	18	+5	6
Cole Smith	69	4	13	17	–3	60
Luke Evangelista	24	7	8	15	+7	6
Tanner Jeannot^{‡}	56	5	9	14	–1	85
Kiefer Sherwood	32	7	6	13	+4	30
Mark Jankowski	50	7	5	12	–1	18
Tyson Barrie^{†}	24	3	9	12	–4	10
Jeremy Lauzon	67	3	9	12	–11	66
Dante Fabbro	79	2	9	11	–4	50
Alexandre Carrier	43	2	7	9	0	27
Michael McCarron	32	2	2	4	–3	24
Eeli Tolvanen	13	2	2	4	–2	4
Cal Foote^{†}	24	1	3	4	+3	35
Jordan Gross	15	3	0	3	–3	2
Zach Sanford	16	2	1	3	–3	4
Spencer Stastney	8	0	2	2	+5	2
John Leonard	6	1	0	1	0	2
Egor Afanasyev	17	1	0	1	–7	2
Kevin Gravel	23	0	1	1	–10	4
Jake Livingstone^{†}	5	0	1	1	–2	2
Mark Borowiecki	4	0	0	0	0	12
Roland McKeown	6	0	0	0	+1	8
Rasmus Asplund^{†}	19	0	0	0	–6	4

=== Goaltenders ===
Regular season
Player	GP	GS	TOI	W	L	OT	GA	GAA	SA	SV%	SO	G	A	PIM
Juuse Saros	64	63	3,809:59	33	23	7	171	2.69	2,099	.919	2	0	1	0
Kevin Lankinen	19	18	1,069:10	9	8	1	49	2.75	583	.916	0	0	0	2
Yaroslav Askarov	1	1	57:50	0	1	0	4	4.15	35	.886	0	0	0	0

^{†}Denotes player spent time with another team before joining the Flyers. Stats reflect time with the Flyers only.
^{‡}Denotes player was traded mid-season. Stats reflect time with the Flyers only.
Bold/italics denotes franchise record.

== Transactions ==
The Predators have been involved in the following transactions during the 2022–23 season.

=== Key ===
† Contract is entry-level.
‡ Contract initially takes effect in the 2023–24 season.

=== Trades ===
Date	Details		Ref
July 8, 2022	To San Jose Sharks Luke Kunin	To Nashville Predators John Leonard; 3rd-round pick in 2023	
July 8, 2022	To Toronto Maple Leafs 4th-round pick in 2022	To Nashville Predators 4th-round pick in 2023	
February 25, 2023	To Winnipeg Jets Nino Niederreiter	To Nashville Predators 2nd-round pick in 2024	
February 26, 2023	To Tampa Bay Lightning Tanner Jeannot	To Nashville Predators Cal Foote; 3rd-round pick in 2023; 4th-round pick in 2023; 5th-round pick in 2023; 2nd-round pick in 2024; Conditional 1st-round pick in 2025	
February 26, 2023	To Philadelphia Flyers Future considerations	To Nashville Predators Isaac Ratcliffe	
February 28, 2023	To New York Rangers Future considerations	To Nashville Predators Austin Rueschhoff	
February 28, 2023	To Edmonton Oilers Mattias Ekholm; 6th-round pick in 2024	To Nashville Predators Tyson Barrie; Reid Schaefer; 1st-round pick in 2023; 4th-round pick in 2024	
March 1, 2023	To Pittsburgh Penguins Mikael Granlund	To Nashville Predators 2nd-round pick in 2023	
March 3, 2023	To Buffalo Sabres 7th-round pick in 2025	To Nashville Predators Rasmus Asplund	
March 8, 2023	To St. Louis Blues Future considerations	To Nashville Predators Anthony Angello	

=== Players acquired ===
Date	Player	Former team	Term	Via	Ref
July 14, 2022	Kevin Gravel	Calgary Flames	2-year	Free agency	
July 14, 2022	Jordan Gross	Colorado Avalanche	2-year	Free agency	
July 14, 2022	Mark Jankowski	Buffalo Sabres	1-year	Free agency	
July 14, 2022	Kevin Lankinen	Chicago Blackhawks	1-year	Free agency	
July 14, 2022	Roland McKeown	Colorado Avalanche	2-year	Free agency	
July 14, 2022	Kiefer Sherwood	Colorado Avalanche	1-year	Free agency	
July 15, 2022	Zach Sanford	Winnipeg Jets	1-year	Free agency	
July 21, 2022	Nino Niederreiter	Carolina Hurricanes	2-year	Free agency	
November 14, 2022	Nolan Burke	Sarnia Sting (OHL)	3-year†	Free agency	
March 29, 2023	Jake Livingstone	Minnesota State Mavericks (CCHA)	1-year†	Free agency	

=== Players lost ===
Date	Player	New team	Term	Via	Ref
July 13, 2022	Matt Benning	San Jose Sharks	4-year	Free agency	
July 13, 2022	Nick Cousins	Florida Panthers	2-year	Free agency	
July 13, 2022	Jeremy Davies	Buffalo Sabres	1-year	Free agency	
July 13, 2022	Matt Luff	Detroit Red Wings	1-year	Free agency	
July 13, 2022	David Rittich	Winnipeg Jets	1-year	Free agency	
July 26, 2022	David Farrance	Chicago Wolves (AHL)	1-year	Free agency	
September 1, 2022	Matt Tennyson	Coachella Valley Firebirds (AHL)	1-year	Free agency	
October 10, 2022	Connor Ingram	Arizona Coyotes		Waivers	
October 15, 2022	Rocco Grimaldi	San Diego Gulls (AHL)	1-year	Free agency	
October 27, 2022	Ben Harpur	New York Rangers	1-year	Free agency	
December 12, 2022	Eeli Tolvanen	Seattle Kraken		Waivers	
April 3, 2023	Markus Nurmi	TPS (Liiga)	3-year‡	Free agency	
May 3, 2023	Mark Borowiecki			Retirement	

=== Signings ===
Date	Player	Term	Ref
July 11, 2022	Filip Forsberg	8-year	
July 13, 2022	Devin Cooley	1-year	
July 13, 2022	Jimmy Huntington	1-year	
July 14, 2022	Cole Smith	1-year	
July 15, 2022	Joakim Kemell	3-year†	
July 18, 2022	John Leonard	1-year	
July 18, 2022	Tommy Novak	1-year	
August 5, 2022	Yakov Trenin	2-year	
February 6, 2023	Cole Smith	1-year‡	
February 8, 2023	Tommy Novak	1-year‡	
March 3, 2023	Dante Fabbro	1-year‡	
March 3, 2023	Kevin Lankinen	1-year‡	
March 13, 2023	Mark Jankowski	1-year‡	
April 16, 2023	Michael McCarron	1-year‡	
April 16, 2023	Kiefer Sherwood	1-year‡	
May 5, 2023	Fedor Svechkov	1-year†‡	
June 27, 2023	Jake Livingstone	2-year‡	

== Draft picks ==
Below are the Nashville Predators' selections at the 2022 NHL entry draft, which was held on July 7 to 8, 2022, at Bell Centre in Montreal.

Round	#	Player	Pos.	Nationality	Team (League)
1	17	Joakim Kemell	RW	Finland	JYP (Liiga)
3	82	Adam Ingram	C	Canada	Youngstown Phantoms (USHL)
3	84	Kasper Kulonummi	D	Finland	Jokerit (U20 SM-sarja)
4	114	Cole O'Hara	RW	Canada	Tri-City Storm (USHL)
5	146	Graham Sward	D	Canada	Lethbridge Hurricanes (WHL)
7	210	Ben Strinden	C	USA	Muskegon Lumberjacks (USHL)
