= 2022–23 Winnipeg Jets season =

National Hockey League season

2022–23 Winnipeg Jets
- Division: 4th Central
- Conference: 8th Western
- 2022–23 record: 46–33–3
- Home record: 26–13–2
- Road record: 20–20–1
- Goals for: 247
- Goals against: 225

Team information
- General manager: Kevin Cheveldayoff
- Coach: Rick Bowness
- Captain: Vacant
- Alternate captains: Adam Lowry; Josh Morrissey; Mark Scheifele
- Arena: Canada Life Centre
- Average attendance: 14,045
- Minor league affiliate: Manitoba Moose (AHL)

Team leaders
- Goals: Mark Scheifele (42)
- Assists: Josh Morrissey (60)
- Points: Kyle Connor (80)
- Penalty minutes: Pierre-Luc Dubois (77)
- Plus/minus: Nate Schmidt (+15)
- Wins: Connor Hellebuyck (37)
- Goals against average: Connor Hellebuyck (2.49)

The 2022–23 Winnipeg Jets season was the 40th season of play for the National Hockey League (NHL) franchise that was established on June 22, 1979, 48th season for the organization overall, and the 12th in Winnipeg, since the franchise relocated from Atlanta prior to the start of the 2011–12 NHL season. This was the first season since the Jets moved from Atlanta that the team did not have a captain, as Blake Wheeler was stripped of his captaincy on September 16, 2022. The Jets clinched a playoff spot after defeating the Minnesota Wild on April 11, 2023, but lost to the Pacific Division champion and eventual Stanley Cup champions, the Vegas Golden Knights, in five games in the First Round.

== Standings ==
=== Divisional standings ===
Central Division
Pos	Team	GP	W	L	OTL	RW	GF	GA	GD	Pts
1	y – Colorado Avalanche	82	51	24	7	36	280	226	+54	109
2	x – Dallas Stars	82	47	21	14	39	285	218	+67	108
3	x – Minnesota Wild	82	46	25	11	34	246	225	+21	103
4	x – Winnipeg Jets	82	46	33	3	36	247	225	+22	95
5	Nashville Predators	82	42	32	8	29	229	238	−9	92
6	St. Louis Blues	82	37	38	7	27	263	301	−38	81
7	Arizona Coyotes	82	28	40	14	20	228	299	−71	70
8	Chicago Blackhawks	82	26	49	7	18	204	301	−97	59

Source: National Hockey League
Rules for classification: 1) Fewer number of games played (GP, only during regular season); 2) Greater number of regulation wins (RW); 3) Greater number of wins in regulation and overtime, excluding shootout wins (ROW); 4) Greater number of total wins, including shootouts (W); 5) Greater number of points earned in head-to-head play; if teams played an uneven number of head-to-head games, the result of the first game on the home ice of the team with the extra home game is discarded; 6) Greater goal differential (GD); 7) Greater number of goals scored (GF)
x – Clinched playoff spot; y – Clinched division

=== Conference standings ===
Western Conference Wild Card
Pos	Div	Team	GP	W	L	OTL	RW	GF	GA	GD	Pts
1	PA	x – Seattle Kraken	82	46	28	8	37	289	256	+33	100
2	CE	x – Winnipeg Jets	82	46	33	3	36	247	225	+22	95
3	PA	Calgary Flames	82	38	27	17	31	260	252	+8	93
4	CE	Nashville Predators	82	42	32	8	29	229	238	−9	92
5	PA	Vancouver Canucks	82	38	37	7	24	276	298	−22	83
6	CE	St. Louis Blues	82	37	38	7	27	263	301	−38	81
7	CE	Arizona Coyotes	82	28	40	14	20	228	299	−71	70
8	PA	San Jose Sharks	82	22	44	16	16	234	321	−87	60
9	CE	Chicago Blackhawks	82	26	49	7	18	204	301	−97	59
10	PA	Anaheim Ducks	82	23	47	12	13	209	338	−129	58

Source: National Hockey League
Rules for classification: 1) Fewer number of games played (GP, only during regular season); 2) Greater number of regulation wins (RW); 3) Greater number of wins in regulation and overtime, excluding shootout wins (ROW); 4) Greater number of total wins, including shootouts (W); 5) Greater number of points earned in head-to-head play; if teams played an uneven number of head-to-head games, the result of the first game on the home ice of the team with the extra home game is discarded; 6) Greater goal differential (GD); 7) Greater number of goals scored (GF)
x – Clinched playoff spot

== Schedule and results ==
=== Preseason ===
2022 preseason: 4–1–1 (home: 2–0–1; road: 2–1–0)

Game	Date	Opponent	Score	OT	Decision	Location	Attendance	Record	Recap
1	September 25	@ Edmonton Oilers	0–4		Rittich	Rogers Place		0–1–0	
2	September 27	Ottawa Senators	5–3		Hellebuyck	Canada Life Centre		1–1–0	
3	September 29	@ Montreal Canadiens	4–3		Rittich	Bell Centre		2–1–0	
4	October 1	Edmonton Oilers	2–3	SO	Hellebuyck	Canada Life Centre		2–1–1	
5	October 5	Calgary Flames	5–0		Rittich	Canada Life Centre		3–1–1	
6	October 7	@ Calgary Flames	5–3		Hellebuyck	Scotiabank Saddledome		4–1–1	

=== Regular season ===
2022–23 game log
October: 5–3–1 (home: 2–1–0; road: 3–2–1)

Game	Date	Opponent	Score	OT	Decision	Location	Attendance	Record	Points	Recap
1	October 14	New York Rangers	4–1		Hellebuyck	Canada Life Centre	14,553	1–0–0	2	
2	October 17	@ Dallas Stars	1–4		Hellebuyck	American Airlines Center	17,875	1–1–0	2	
3	October 19	@ Colorado Avalanche	4–3	OT	Hellebuyck	Ball Arena	18,062	2–1–0	4	
4	October 20	@ Vegas Golden Knights	2–5		Rittich	T-Mobile Arena	17,777	2–2–0	4	
5	October 22	Toronto Maple Leafs	1–4		Hellebuyck	Canada Life Centre	15,325	2–3–0	4	
6	October 24	St. Louis Blues	4–0		Hellebuyck	Canada Life Centre	13,936	3–3–0	6	
7	October 27	@ Los Angeles Kings	6–4		Hellebuyck	Crypto.com Arena	15,716	4–3–0	8	
8	October 28	@ Arizona Coyotes	3–2	OT	Rittich	Mullett Arena	4,600	5–3–0	10	
9	October 30	@ Vegas Golden Knights	1–2	OT	Hellebuyck	T-Mobile Arena	17,824	5–3–1	11	

November: 9–3–0 (home: 6–1–0; road: 3–2–0)

Game	Date	Opponent	Score	OT	Decision	Location	Attendance	Record	Points	Recap
10	November 3	Montreal Canadiens	3–2	OT	Hellebuyck	Canada Life Centre	13,729	6–3–1	13	
11	November 5	Chicago Blackhawks	4–0		Hellebuyck	Canada Life Centre	13,210	7–3–1	15	
12	November 8	Dallas Stars	5–1		Hellebuyck	Canada Life Centre	13,847	8–3–1	17	
13	November 12	@ Calgary Flames	2–3		Hellebuyck	Scotiabank Saddledome	18,501	8–4–1	17	
14	November 13	@ Seattle Kraken	3–2	OT	Rittich	Climate Pledge Arena	17,151	9–4–1	19	
15	November 17	Anaheim Ducks	3–2		Hellebuyck	Canada Life Centre	14,278	10–4–1	21	
16	November 19	Pittsburgh Penguins	0–3		Hellebuyck	Canada Life Centre	15,325	10–5–1	21	
17	November 21	Carolina Hurricanes	4–3	OT	Rittich	Canada Life Centre	13,346	11–5–1	23	
18	November 23	@ Minnesota Wild	1–6		Hellebuyck	Xcel Energy Center	17,450	11–6–1	23	
19	November 25	@ Dallas Stars	5–4	OT	Hellebuyck	American Airlines Center	18,532	12–6–1	25	
20	November 27	@ Chicago Blackhawks	7–2		Hellebuyck	United Center	17,611	13–6–1	27	
21	November 29	Colorado Avalanche	5–0		Hellebuyck	Canada Life Centre	13,510	14–6–1	29	

December: 9–7–0 (home: 5–4–0; road: 4–3–0)

Game	Date	Opponent	Score	OT	Decision	Location	Attendance	Record	Points	Recap
22	December 2	Columbus Blue Jackets	1–4		Rittich	Canada Life Centre	13,240	14–7–1	29	
23	December 4	Anaheim Ducks	5–2		Hellebuyck	Canada Life Centre	13,444	15–7–1	31	
24	December 6	Florida Panthers	5–2		Hellebuyck	Canada Life Centre	13,426	16–7–1	33	
25	December 8	@ St. Louis Blues	5–2		Hellebuyck	Enterprise Center	18,096	17–7–1	35	
26	December 9	@ Chicago Blackhawks	3–1		Rittich	United Center	17,847	18–7–1	37	
27	December 11	Washington Capitals	2–5		Hellebuyck	Canada Life Centre	14,096	18–8–1	37	
28	December 13	Vegas Golden Knights	5–6		Hellebuyck	Canada Life Centre	13,102	18–9–1	37	
29	December 15	Nashville Predators	2–1	OT	Hellebuyck	Canada Life Centre	13,949	19–9–1	39	
30	December 17	@ Vancouver Canucks	5–1		Hellebuyck	Rogers Arena	18,487	20–9–1	41	
31	December 18	@ Seattle Kraken	2–3		Rittich	Climate Pledge Arena	17,151	20–10–1	41	
32	December 20	Ottawa Senators	5–1		Rittich	Canada Life Centre	14,277	21–10–1	43	
33	December 22	@ Boston Bruins	2–3		Hellebuyck	TD Garden	17,850	21–11–1	43	
34	December 23	@ Washington Capitals	1–4		Rittich	Capital One Arena	18,573	21–12–1	43	
35	December 27	Minnesota Wild	1–4		Hellebuyck	Canada Life Centre	15,325	21–13–1	43	
36	December 29	Vancouver Canucks	4–2		Hellebuyck	Canada Life Centre	15,325	22–13–1	45	
37	December 31	@ Edmonton Oilers	2–1		Hellebuyck	Rogers Place	18,347	23–13–1	47	

January: 9–6–0 (home: 5–2–0; road: 4–4–0)

Game	Date	Opponent	Score	OT	Decision	Location	Attendance	Record	Points	Recap
38	January 3	Calgary Flames	3–2		Hellebuyck	Canada Life Centre	14,130	24–13–1	49	
39	January 6	Tampa Bay Lightning	4–2		Hellebuyck	Canada Life Centre	15,325	25–13–1	51	
40	January 8	Vancouver Canucks	7–4		Rittich	Canada Life Centre	14,206	26–13–1	53	
41	January 10	@ Detroit Red Wings	5–7		Hellebuyck	Little Caesars Arena	19,075	26–14–1	53	
42	January 12	@ Buffalo Sabres	4–2		Hellebuyck	KeyBank Center	15,208	27–14–1	55	
43	January 13	@ Pittsburgh Penguins	4–1		Rittich	PPG Paints Arena	18,268	28–14–1	57	
44	January 15	Arizona Coyotes	2–1		Hellebuyck	Canada Life Centre	13,949	29–14–1	59	
45	January 17	@ Montreal Canadiens	1–4		Hellebuyck	Bell Centre	21,105	29–15–1	59	
46	January 19	@ Toronto Maple Leafs	1–4		Hellebuyck	Scotiabank Arena	18,644	29–16–1	59	
47	January 21	@ Ottawa Senators	5–1		Hellebuyck	Canadian Tire Centre	19,042	30–16–1	61	
48	January 22	@ Philadelphia Flyers	5–3		Rittich	Wells Fargo Center	15,441	31–16–1	63	
49	January 24	@ Nashville Predators	1–2		Hellebuyck	Bridgestone Arena	17,159	31–17–1	63	
50	January 26	Buffalo Sabres	2–3		Hellebuyck	Canada Life Centre	13,589	31–18–1	63	
51	January 28	Philadelphia Flyers	0–4		Hellebuyck	Canada Life Centre	14,476	31–19–1	63	
52	January 30	St. Louis Blues	4–2		Hellebuyck	Canada Life Centre	13,756	32–19–1	65	

February: 3–5–1 (home: 2–2–1; road: 1–3–0)

Game	Date	Opponent	Score	OT	Decision	Location	Attendance	Record	Points	Recap
53	February 11	Chicago Blackhawks	4–1		Hellebuyck	Canada Life Centre	14,440	33–19–1	67	
54	February 14	Seattle Kraken	3–2	SO	Rittich	Canada Life Centre	14,237	34–19–1	69	
55	February 16	@ Columbus Blue Jackets	1–3		Rittich	Nationwide Arena	16,032	34–20–1	69	
56	February 19	@ New Jersey Devils	2–4		Hellebuyck	Prudential Center	16,514	34–21–1	69	
57	February 20	@ New York Rangers	4–1		Hellebuyck	Madison Square Garden	18,006	35–21–1	71	
58	February 22	@ New York Islanders	1–2		Hellebuyck	UBS Arena	17,255	35–22–1	71	
59	February 24	Colorado Avalanche	1–5		Hellebuyck	Canada Life Centre	14,157	35–23–1	71	
60	February 26	New York Islanders	0–4		Rittich	Canada Life Centre	13,797	35–24–1	71	
61	February 28	Los Angeles Kings	5–6	SO	Hellebuyck	Canada Life Centre	13,203	35–24–2	72	

March: 7–7–1 (home: 3–2–1; road: 4–5–0)

Game	Date	Opponent	Score	OT	Decision	Location	Attendance	Record	Points	Recap
62	March 3	@ Edmonton Oilers	3–6		Hellebuyck	Rogers Place	18,347	35–25–2	72	
63	March 4	Edmonton Oilers	7–5		Hellebuyck	Canada Life Centre	15,324	36–25–2	74	
64	March 6	San Jose Sharks	2–3	OT	Rittich	Canada Life Centre	13,026	36–25–3	75	
65	March 8	Minnesota Wild	2–4		Hellebuyck	Canada Life Centre	13,148	36–26–3	75	
66	March 11	@ Florida Panthers	5–4	OT	Hellebuyck	FLA Live Arena	16,340	37–26–3	77	
67	March 12	@ Tampa Bay Lightning	3–2		Hellebuyck	Amalie Arena	19,092	38–26–3	79	
68	March 14	@ Carolina Hurricanes	3–5		Rittich	PNC Arena	18,680	38–27–3	79	
69	March 16	Boston Bruins	0–3		Hellebuyck	Canada Life Centre	14,555	38–28–3	79	
70	March 18	@ Nashville Predators	3–2	OT	Hellebuyck	Bridgestone Arena	17,402	39–28–3	81	
71	March 19	@ St. Louis Blues	0–3		Hellebuyck	Enterprise Center	18,096	39–29–3	81	
72	March 21	Arizona Coyotes	2–1		Hellebuyck	Canada Life Centre	13,216	40–29–3	83	
73	March 23	@ Anaheim Ducks	3–2		Hellebuyck	Honda Center	12,331	41–29–3	85	
74	March 25	@ Los Angeles Kings	1–4		Hellebuyck	Crypto.com Arena	18,230	41–30–3	85	
75	March 28	@ San Jose Sharks	0–3		Hellebuyck	SAP Center	10,387	41–31–3	85	
76	March 31	Detroit Red Wings	6–2		Hellebuyck	Canada Life Centre	14,389	42–31–3	87	

April: 4–2–0 (home: 3–1–0; road: 1–1–0)

Game	Date	Opponent	Score	OT	Decision	Location	Attendance	Record	Points	Recap
77	April 2	New Jersey Devils	6–1		Hellebuyck	Canada Life Centre	14,107	43–31–3	89	
78	April 5	Calgary Flames	1–3		Hellebuyck	Canada Life Centre	14,077	43–32–3	89	
79	April 8	Nashville Predators	2–0		Hellebuyck	Canada Life Centre	14,075	44–32–3	91	
80	April 10	San Jose Sharks	6–2		Hellebuyck	Canada Life Centre	13,428	45–32–3	93	
81	April 11	@ Minnesota Wild	3–1		Hellebuyck	Xcel Energy Center	19,199	46–32–3	95	
82	April 13	@ Colorado Avalanche	2–4		Rittich	Ball Arena	18,137	46–33–3	95	

2022–23 schedule

Win (2 Points) Loss (0 points) Overtime/shootout loss (1 point)

=== Playoffs ===
2023 Stanley Cup playoffs

Western Conference First Round vs. (P1) Vegas Golden Knights: Vegas won 4–1
#	Date	Visitor	Score	Home	OT	Decision	Attendance	Series	Recap
1	April 18	Winnipeg	5–1	Vegas		Hellebuyck	18,006	1–0
2	April 20	Winnipeg	2–5	Vegas		Hellebuyck	18,333	1–1
3	April 22	Vegas	5–4	Winnipeg	2OT	Hellebuyck	15,325	1–2
4	April 24	Vegas	4–2	Winnipeg		Hellebuyck	15,324	1–3
5	April 27	Winnipeg	1–4	Vegas		Hellebuyck	18,476	1–4

Legend: Win Loss

== Player statistics ==
=== Skaters ===
Regular season
Player	GP	G	A	Pts	+/−	PIM
Kyle Connor	82	31	49	80	−11	20
Josh Morrissey	78	16	60	76	+2	41
Mark Scheifele	81	42	26	68	−16	43
Pierre-Luc Dubois	73	27	36	63	+5	77
Blake Wheeler	72	16	39	55	−3	46
Nikolaj Ehlers	45	12	26	38	−2	11
Adam Lowry	82	13	23	36	+4	48
Neal Pionk	82	10	23	33	−12	44
Cole Perfetti	51	8	22	30	+10	16
Dylan DeMelo	75	6	21	27	+10	50
Brenden Dillon	82	2	21	23	+2	76
Morgan Barron	70	8	13	21	+4	31
Nate Schmidt	71	7	12	19	+15	8
Mason Appleton	41	5	11	16	+2	8
Sam Gagner	48	8	6	14	−4	13
Axel Jonsson-Fjallby	50	6	8	14	−1	8
Nino Niederreiter^{†}	22	6	7	13	−4	6
Saku Maenalanen	64	4	6	10	0	16
Vladislav Namestnikov^{†}	20	2	8	10	+7	16
Kevin Stenlund	54	6	3	9	+3	20
Dylan Samberg	63	2	6	8	+10	25
David Gustafsson	46	0	6	6	+2	6
Jansen Harkins	22	3	2	5	+4	12
Mikey Eyssimont	19	1	4	5	+5	7
Karson Kuhlman^{†}	33	2	2	4	−7	8
Logan Stanley	19	1	2	3	−1	21
Kyle Capobianco	14	2	0	2	+1	6
Dominic Toninato	5	0	1	1	0	2
Ville Heinola	10	0	1	1	−5	2
Kristian Reichel	2	0	1	1	0	0

Playoffs
Player	GP	G	A	Pts	+/−	PIM
Neal Pionk	5	0	7	7	−6	0
Blake Wheeler	5	2	4	6	+2	0
Adam Lowry	5	4	1	5	−1	2
Kyle Connor	5	3	1	4	0	0
Pierre-Luc Dubois	5	2	2	4	−4	8
Nino Niederreiter	5	1	3	4	−7	2
Nate Schmidt	5	0	2	2	−2	0
Vladislav Namestnikov	5	0	2	2	0	2
Dylan DeMelo	5	0	2	2	−1	6
Kevin Stenlund	5	1	0	1	+1	2
Mark Scheifele	4	1	0	1	−1	4
Josh Morrissey	3	0	1	1	+1	0
Saku Maenalanen	5	0	1	1	0	12
Brenden Dillon	5	0	1	1	−3	9
David Gustafsson	3	0	0	0	+2	0
Karson Kuhlman	1	0	0	0	0	2
Morgan Barron	5	0	0	0	−6	2
Dylan Samberg	5	0	0	0	−3	8
Axel Jonsson-Fjallby	1	0	0	0	0	0
Logan Stanley	1	0	0	0	−1	0
Mason Appleton	5	0	0	0	−4	0
Kyle Capobianco	1	0	0	0	−1	0
Nikolaj Ehlers	1	0	0	0	0	0

=== Goaltenders ===
Regular season
Player	GP	GS	TOI	W	L	OT	GA	GAA	SA	SV%	SO	G	A	PIM
Connor Hellebuyck	64	64	3,778:00	37	25	2	157	2.49	1,964	.920	4	0	0	0
David Rittich	21	18	1,121:41	9	8	1	50	2.67	506	.901	0	0	0	2

Playoffs
Player	GP	GS	TOI	W	L	GA	GAA	SA	SV%	SO	G	A	PIM
Connor Hellebuyck	5	5	314:02	1	4	18	3.44	158	.886	0	0	0	0

^{†}Denotes player spent time with another team before joining the Jets. Stats reflect time with the Jets only.
^{‡}Denotes player was traded mid-season. Stats reflect time with the Jets only.

== Transactions ==
The Jets have been involved in the following transactions during the 2022–23 season.

Key:

† Contract is entry-level.
‡ Contract initially takes effect in the 2023–24 season.

=== Trades ===
Date	Details		Ref
February 25, 2023	To Nashville Predators 2nd-round pick in 2024	To Winnipeg Jets Nino Niederreiter	
March 3, 2023	To San Jose Sharks 4th-round pick in 2025	To Winnipeg Jets Vladislav Namestnikov	
June 27, 2023	To Los Angeles Kings Pierre-Luc Dubois	To Winnipeg Jets Alex Iafallo; Rasmus Kupari; Gabriel Vilardi; MTL 2nd-round pick in 2024	

=== Players acquired ===
Date	Player	Former team	Term	Via	Ref
July 13, 2022	David Rittich	Nashville Predators	1-year	Free agency	
July 13, 2022	Kevin Stenlund	Columbus Blue Jackets	1-year	Free agency	
July 14, 2022	Kyle Capobianco	Arizona Coyotes	2-year	Free agency	
July 14, 2022	Alex Limoges	San Diego Gulls (AHL)	1-year†	Free agency	
July 15, 2022	Ashton Sautner	Vancouver Canucks	1-year	Free agency	
July 19, 2022	Saku Maenalanen	Oulun Kärpät (Liiga)	1-year	Free agency	
September 2, 2022	Sam Gagner	Detroit Red Wings	1-year	Free agency	
October 10, 2022	Axel Jonsson-Fjallby	Washington Capitals		Waivers	
December 13, 2022	Karson Kuhlman	Seattle Kraken		Waivers	
March 1, 2023	Evan Cormier	Manitoba Moose (AHL)	1-year	Free agency	
March 25, 2023	Parker Ford	Providence Friars (HE)	2-year†‡	Free agency	

=== Players lost ===
Date	Player	New team	Term	Via	Ref
July 13, 2022	Adam Brooks	Philadelphia Flyers	2-year	Free agency	
July 13, 2022	Eric Comrie	Buffalo Sabres	2-year	Free agency	
July 13, 2022	Austin Poganski	Seattle Kraken	1-year	Free agency	
July 13, 2022	C. J. Suess	San Jose Sharks	1-year	Free agency	
July 15, 2022	Zach Sanford	Nashville Predators	1-year	Free agency	
July 17, 2022	Philippe Desrosiers	Laval Rocket (AHL)	1-year	Free agency	
August 10, 2022	Luke Johnson	San Jose Barracuda (AHL)	1-year	Free agency	
August 10, 2022	Markus Phillips	Porin Ässät (Liiga)	1-year	Free agency	
August 23, 2022	Paul Stastny	Carolina Hurricanes	1-year	Free agency	
September 3, 2022	Evgeny Svechnikov	San Jose Sharks	1-year	Free agency	
October 8, 2022	Johnathan Kovacevic	Montreal Canadiens		Waivers	
May 10, 2023	Leon Gawanke	Adler Mannheim (DEL)	4-year‡	Free agency	

=== Signings ===
Date	Player	Term	Ref
July 15, 2022	Elias Salomonsson	3-year†	
July 16, 2022	Jansen Harkins	2-year	
July 22, 2022	Pierre-Luc Dubois	1-year	
July 22, 2022	Johnathan Kovacevic	3-year	
July 22, 2022	Jeff Malott	2-year	
August 2, 2022	Leon Gawanke	1-year	
August 7, 2022	Mason Appleton	3-year	
August 10, 2022	David Gustafsson	2-year	
October 12, 2022	Brad Lambert	3-year†	
December 30, 2022	Danny Zhilkin	3-year†	
April 19, 2023	Dominic Toninato	2-year‡	
May 1, 2023	Nikita Chibrikov	3-year†‡	
June 15, 2023	Fabian Wagner	3-year†‡	
June 23, 2023	Ashton Sautner	1-year‡	
June 27, 2023	Pierre-Luc Dubois	8-year‡	

== Draft picks ==
Below are the Winnipeg Jets' selections at the 2022 NHL entry draft, which was held on July 7 to 8, 2022, at Bell Centre in Montreal.

Round	#	Player	Pos.	Nationality	Team (League)
1	14	Rutger McGroarty	C	USA	U.S. NTDP (USHL)
1	30	Brad Lambert	C	Finland	Lahti Pelicans (Liiga)
3	77	Elias Salomonsson	D	Sweden	Skellefteå AIK (J20 Nationell)
3	77	Danny Zhilkin	C	Canada	Guelph Storm (OHL)
4	99	Garrett Brown	D	USA	Sioux City Musketeers (USHL)
6	175	Fabian Wagner	C	Sweden	Linköping HC (J20 Nationell)
7	207	Domenic DiVincentiis	G	Canada	North Bay Battalion (OHL)
