= Angus Booth =

Canadian ice hockey player (born 2004)

- Born: April 27, 2004 (age 22) Montreal, Quebec, Canada
- Height: 6 ft 0 in (183 cm)
- Weight: 177 lb (80 kg; 12 st 9 lb)
- Position: Defence
- Shoots: Left
- NHL team (P) Cur. team: Los Angeles Kings; Ontario Reign (AHL)
- NHL draft: 116th overall, 2022; Los Angeles Kings
- Playing career: 2024–present

Angus Booth (born April 27, 2004) is a Canadian professional ice hockey defenceman for the Ontario Reign of the American Hockey League (AHL), while under contract to the Los Angeles Kings of the National Hockey League (NHL).

== Playing career ==
Booth played major junior hockey with Shawinigan Cataractes and Baie-Comeau Drakkar in the Quebec Maritimes Junior Hockey League (QMJHL), and was seleted in the fourth-round, 116th overall, by the Los Angeles Kings in the 2022 NHL entry draft.

He was signed to a three-year, entry-level contract with the Kings on December 29, 2023.

During the 2025–26 season, on March 2, 2026, Booth was recalled by the Kings from his assignment in the AHL with the Ontario Reign and made his NHL debut with Los Angeles against the Colorado Avalanche, scoring one goal in a third-pairing role from the blueline.

== Career statistics ==
			Regular season					Playoffs
Season	Team	League	GP	G	A	Pts	PIM	GP	G	A	Pts	PIM
2019–20	Laval-Montréal Rousseau Royal	QMAAA	38	1	4	5	14	5	0	2	2	0
2020–21	Shawinigan Cataractes	QMJHL	33	0	3	3	6	5	0	0	0	0
2021–22	Shawinigan Cataractes	QMJHL	42	1	22	23	32	16	2	2	4	12
2022–23	Shawinigan Cataractes	QMJHL	62	3	16	19	62	5	1	4	5	6
2023–24	Shawinigan Cataractes	QMJHL	31	2	13	15	26	—	—	—	—	—
2023–24	Baie-Comeau Drakkar	QMJHL	30	1	12	13	31	17	0	3	3	10
2024–25	Ontario Reign	AHL	50	2	11	13	38	2	0	0	0	4
2025–26	Ontario Reign	AHL	61	1	17	18	40	5	0	1	1	0
2025–26	Los Angeles Kings	NHL	1	1	0	1	0	—	—	—	—	—
NHL totals			1	1	0	1	0	—	—	—	—	—
