= 2022–23 Vegas Golden Knights season =

National Hockey League season

2022–23 Vegas Golden Knights
- Stanley Cup champions
- Western Conference champions
- Pacific Division champions
- Division: 1st Pacific
- Conference: 1st Western
- 2022–23 record: 51–22–9
- Home record: 25–15–1
- Road record: 26–7–8
- Goals for: 272
- Goals against: 229

Team information
- General manager: Kelly McCrimmon
- Coach: Bruce Cassidy
- Captain: Mark Stone
- Alternate captains: Alex Pietrangelo; Reilly Smith
- Arena: T-Mobile Arena
- Average attendance: 18,024
- Minor league affiliates: Henderson Silver Knights (AHL); Savannah Ghost Pirates (ECHL)

Team leaders
- Goals: Jonathan Marchessault (28)
- Assists: Chandler Stephenson (49)
- Points: Jack Eichel (66)
- Penalty minutes: Keegan Kolesar (68)
- Plus/minus: Alec Martinez (+30)
- Wins: Logan Thompson (21)
- Goals against average: Laurent Brossoit (2.17)

The 2022–23 Vegas Golden Knights season was the sixth season for the National Hockey League (NHL) franchise that started playing in the 2017–18 season.

On March 30, 2023, the Golden Knights clinched a playoff berth after the Nashville Predators lost to the Pittsburgh Penguins, returning to the playoffs after missing the previous postseason. The Golden Knights then clinched their third Pacific Division championship, as well as the first seed in the Western Conference, with a victory over the Seattle Kraken on April 13, 2023.

For the fourth time in their six-year history, the Golden Knights advanced to the Western Conference Finals, where they defeated the Dallas Stars in six games to advance to the Stanley Cup Final for the second time in team history. The Golden Knights defeated the Florida Panthers in five games to win their first Stanley Cup.

== Standings ==
=== Divisional standings ===
Pacific Division
Pos	Team	GP	W	L	OTL	RW	GF	GA	GD	Pts
1	z – Vegas Golden Knights	82	51	22	9	38	272	229	+43	111
2	x – Edmonton Oilers	82	50	23	9	45	325	260	+65	109
3	x – Los Angeles Kings	82	47	25	10	37	280	257	+23	104
4	x – Seattle Kraken	82	46	28	8	37	289	256	+33	100
5	Calgary Flames	82	38	27	17	31	260	252	+8	93
6	Vancouver Canucks	82	38	37	7	24	276	298	−22	83
7	San Jose Sharks	82	22	44	16	16	234	321	−87	60
8	Anaheim Ducks	82	23	47	12	13	209	338	−129	58

Source: National Hockey League
Rules for classification: 1) Fewer number of games played (GP, only during regular season); 2) Greater number of regulation wins (RW); 3) Greater number of wins in regulation and overtime, excluding shootout wins (ROW); 4) Greater number of total wins, including shootouts (W); 5) Greater number of points earned in head-to-head play; if teams played an uneven number of head-to-head games, the result of the first game on the home ice of the team with the extra home game is discarded; 6) Greater goal differential (GD); 7) Greater number of goals scored (GF)
x – Clinched playoff spot; z – Clinched conference

=== Conference standings ===
Western Conference Wild Card
Pos	Div	Team	GP	W	L	OTL	RW	GF	GA	GD	Pts
1	PA	x – Seattle Kraken	82	46	28	8	37	289	256	+33	100
2	CE	x – Winnipeg Jets	82	46	33	3	36	247	225	+22	95
3	PA	Calgary Flames	82	38	27	17	31	260	252	+8	93
4	CE	Nashville Predators	82	42	32	8	29	229	238	−9	92
5	PA	Vancouver Canucks	82	38	37	7	24	276	298	−22	83
6	CE	St. Louis Blues	82	37	38	7	27	263	301	−38	81
7	CE	Arizona Coyotes	82	28	40	14	20	228	299	−71	70
8	PA	San Jose Sharks	82	22	44	16	16	234	321	−87	60
9	CE	Chicago Blackhawks	82	26	49	7	18	204	301	−97	59
10	PA	Anaheim Ducks	82	23	47	12	13	209	338	−129	58

Source: National Hockey League
Rules for classification: 1) Fewer number of games played (GP, only during regular season); 2) Greater number of regulation wins (RW); 3) Greater number of wins in regulation and overtime, excluding shootout wins (ROW); 4) Greater number of total wins, including shootouts (W); 5) Greater number of points earned in head-to-head play; if teams played an uneven number of head-to-head games, the result of the first game on the home ice of the team with the extra home game is discarded; 6) Greater goal differential (GD); 7) Greater number of goals scored (GF)
x – Clinched playoff spot

== Schedule and results ==
=== Preseason ===
The 2022 preseason schedule was published on July 6, 2022.

2022 preseason game log: 4–2–1 (home: 3–1–1; road: 1–1–0)
#	Date	Visitor	Score	Home	OT	Decision	Attendance	Record	Recap
1	September 25	Vegas	1–3	Colorado		Patera	14,137	0–1–0
2	September 26	Los Angeles	2–1	Vegas	OT	Hill	17,026	0–1–1
3	September 28	Colorado	1–7	Vegas		Thompson	17,169	1–1–1
4	September 30	San Jose	7–3	Vegas		Hill	17,446	1–2–1
5	October 4	Arizona	3–4	Vegas		Hill	17,127	2–2–1
6	October 6	Vegas	6–4	Los Angeles		Thompson	9,869 (Note: Played in Salt Lake City, Utah at Vivint Arena, with the Kings as the designated home team.)	3–2–1
7	October 8	Arizona	1–5	Vegas		Thompson	5,240 (Note: Played in Boise, Idaho at Idaho Central Arena, with the Golden Knights as the designated home team.)	4–2–1

=== Regular season ===
The regular season schedule was published on July 6, 2022.

2022–23 game log

October: 8–2–0 (home: 5–1–0; road: 3–1–0)
#	Date	Visitor	Score	Home	OT	Decision	Attendance	Record	Pts	Recap
1	October 11	Vegas	4–3	Los Angeles		Thompson	18,230	1–0–0	2
2	October 13	Chicago	0–1	Vegas		Thompson	18,467	2–0–0	4
3	October 15	Vegas	5–2	Seattle		Hill	17,151	3–0–0	6
4	October 18	Vegas	2–3	Calgary		Thompson	16,944	3–1–0	6
5	October 20	Winnipeg	2–5	Vegas		Hill	17,777	4–1–0	8
6	October 22	Colorado	3–2	Vegas		Thompson	18,207	4–2–0	8
7	October 24	Toronto	1–3	Vegas		Thompson	17,989	5–2–0	10
8	October 25	Vegas	4–2	San Jose		Hill	12,003	6–2–0	12
9	October 28	Anaheim	0–4	Vegas		Thompson	18,036	7–2–0	14
10	October 30	Winnipeg	1–2	Vegas	OT	Hill	17,824	8–2–0	16

November: 9–4–1 (Home: 2–4–0; Road: 7–0–1)
#	Date	Visitor	Score	Home	OT	Decision	Attendance	Record	Pts	Recap
11	November 1	Vegas	3–2	Washington	OT	Thompson	18,573	9–2–0	18
12	November 3	Vegas	5–4	Ottawa		Thompson	16,043	10–2–0	20
13	November 5	Vegas	6–4	Montreal		Hill	21,105	11–2–0	22
14	November 8	Vegas	4–3	Toronto	OT	Thompson	18,459	12–2–0	24
15	November 10	Vegas	7–4	Buffalo		Thompson	15,757	13–2–0	26
16	November 12	St. Louis	3–2	Vegas		Hill	18,343	13–3–0	26
17	November 15	San Jose	5–2	Vegas		Thompson	17,899	13–4–0	26
18	November 17	Arizona	1–4	Vegas		Thompson	17,708	14–4–0	28
19	November 19	Vegas	3–4	Edmonton	OT	Hill	18,347	14–4–1	29
20	November 21	Vegas	5–4	Vancouver		Thompson	18,558	15–4–1	31
21	November 23	Ottawa	1–4	Vegas		Thompson	17,955	16–4–1	33
22	November 25	Seattle	4–2	Vegas		Hill	18,119	16–5–1	33
23	November 26	Vancouver	5–1	Vegas		Thompson	18,004	16–6–1	33
24	November 28	Vegas	3–2	Columbus	SO	Thompson	13,771	17–6–1	35

December: 8–6–1 (Home: 4–4–0; Road: 4–2–1)
#	Date	Visitor	Score	Home	OT	Decision	Attendance	Record	Pts	Recap
25	December 1	Vegas	3–4	Pittsburgh		Thompson	15,895	17–7–1	35
26	December 3	Vegas	4–1	Detroit		Hill	19,515	18–7–1	37
27	December 5	Vegas	4–3	Boston	SO	Thompson	17,850	19–7–1	39
28	December 7	NY Rangers	5–1	Vegas		Thompson	17,939	19–8–1	39
29	December 9	Philadelphia	1–2	Vegas	OT	Hill	17,767	20–8–1	41
30	December 11	Boston	3–1	Vegas		Thompson	18,114	20–9–1	41
31	December 13	Vegas	6–5	Winnipeg		Hill	13,102	21–9–1	43
32	December 15	Vegas	4–1	Chicago		Thompson	15,911	22–9–1	45
33	December 17	NY Islanders	5–2	Vegas		Thompson	18,007	22–10–1	45
34	December 19	Buffalo	3–2	Vegas		Hill	17,808	22–11–1	45
35	December 21	Arizona	2–5	Vegas		Thompson	17,711	23–11–1	47
36	December 23	St. Louis	4–5	Vegas	SO	Thompson	18,125	24–11–1	49
37	December 27	Vegas	2–4	Los Angeles		Thompson	18,230	24–12–1	49
38	December 28	Vegas	2–3	Anaheim	SO	Thompson	15,156	24–12–2	50
39	December 31	Nashville	4–5	Vegas	OT	Thompson	18,333	25–12–2	52

January: 4–6–2 (Home: 3–4–0; Road: 1–2–2)
#	Date	Visitor	Score	Home	OT	Decision	Attendance	Record	Pts	Recap
40	January 2	Vegas	3–2	Colorado		Thompson	18,092	26–12–2	54
41	January 5	Pittsburgh	2–5	Vegas		Hill	18,149	27–12–2	56
42	January 7	Los Angeles	5–1	Vegas		Thompson	18,339	27–13–2	56
43	January 12	Florida	2–4	Vegas		Hill	17,735	28–13–2	58
44	January 14	Edmonton	4–3	Vegas		Thompson	18,143	28–14–2	58
45	January 16	Dallas	4–0	Vegas		Thompson	17,895	28–15–2	58
46	January 19	Detroit	3–2	Vegas		Hill	17,911	28–16–2	58
47	January 21	Washington	2–6	Vegas		Thompson	18,251	29–16–2	60
48	January 22	Vegas	1–4	Arizona		Thompson	4,600	29–17–2	60
49	January 24	Vegas	2–3	New Jersey	OT	Thompson	16,086	29–17–3	61
50	January 27	Vegas	1–4	NY Rangers		Hill	18,006	29–18–3	61
51	January 28	Vegas	1–2	NY Islanders	OT	Thompson	17,255	29–18–4	62

February: 6–1–2 (Home: 4–0–1; Road: 2–1–1)
#	Date	Visitor	Score	Home	OT	Decision	Attendance	Record	Pts	Recap
52	February 7	Vegas	5–1	Nashville		Hill	17,159	30–18–4	64
53	February 9	Vegas	5–1	Minnesota		Thompson	18,797	31–18–4	66
54	February 12	Anaheim	2–7	Vegas		Hill	17,504	32–18–4	68
55	February 16	San Jose	1–2	Vegas		Hill	17,544	33–18–4	70
56	February 18	Tampa Bay	4–5	Vegas		Hill	18,317	34–18–4	72
57	February 21	Vegas	2–3	Chicago	SO	Brossoit	18,083	34–18–5	73
58	February 23	Calgary	3–4	Vegas	OT	Brossoit	17,609	35–18–5	75
59	February 25	Dallas	3–2	Vegas	SO	Brossoit	17,906	35–18–6	76
60	February 27	Vegas	0–3	Colorado		Hill	18,117	35–19–6	76

March: 11–3–1 (Home: 4–2–0; Road: 7–1–1)
#	Date	Visitor	Score	Home	OT	Decision	Attendance	Record	Pts	Recap
61	March 1	Carolina	2–3	Vegas		Hill	17,669	36–19–6	78
62	March 3	New Jersey	3–4	Vegas	SO	Hill	18,033	37–19–6	80
63	March 5	Montreal	3–4	Vegas		Quick	18,049	38–19–6	82
64	March 7	Vegas	1–2	Florida		Hill	15,100	38–20–6	82
65	March 9	Vegas	4–3	Tampa Bay	OT	Quick	19,092	39–20–6	84
66	March 11	Vegas	4–0	Carolina		Quick	18,813	40–20–6	86
67	March 12	Vegas	5–3	St. Louis		Patera	18,096	41–20–6	88
68	March 14	Vegas	5–3	Philadelphia		Quick	17,192	42–20–6	90
69	March 16	Calgary	7–2	Vegas		Quick	18,207	42–21–6	90
70	March 19	Columbus	2–7	Vegas		Patera	18,004	43–21–6	92
71	March 21	Vegas	4–3	Vancouver		Quick	18,757	44–21–6	94
72	March 23	Vegas	3–2	Calgary		Thompson	18,157	45–21–6	96
73	March 25	Vegas	4–3	Edmonton	OT	Brossoit	18,347	46–21–6	98
74	March 28	Edmonton	7–4	Vegas		Quick	18,391	46–22–6	98
75	March 30	Vegas	3–4	San Jose	OT	Brossoit	15,232	46–22–7	99

April: 5–0–2 (Home: 3–0–0; Road: 2–0–2)
#	Date	Visitor	Score	Home	OT	Decision	Attendance	Record	Pts	Recap
76	April 1	Minnesota	1–4	Vegas		Brossoit	18,398	47–22–7	101
77	April 3	Vegas	4–3	Minnesota	SO	Brossoit	19,176	48–22–7	103
78	April 4	Vegas	2–3	Nashville	OT	Quick	17,420	48–22–8	104
79	April 6	Los Angeles	2–5	Vegas		Brossoit	18,404	49–22–8	106
80	April 8	Vegas	1–2	Dallas	SO	Quick	18,532	49–22–9	107
81	April 11	Seattle	1–4	Vegas		Brossoit	18,377	50–22–9	109
82	April 13	Vegas	3–1	Seattle		Brossoit	17,151	51–22–9	111

Legend: Win (2 points) Loss (0 points) Overtime/shootout loss (1 point)

=== Playoffs ===
2023 Stanley Cup playoffs

Western Conference First Round vs. (WC2) Winnipeg Jets: Vegas won 4–1
#	Date	Visitor	Score	Home	OT	Decision	Attendance	Series	Recap
1	April 18	Winnipeg	5–1	Vegas		Brossoit	18,006	0–1
2	April 20	Winnipeg	2–5	Vegas		Brossoit	18,333	1–1
3	April 22	Vegas	5–4	Winnipeg	2OT	Brossoit	15,325	2–1
4	April 24	Vegas	4–2	Winnipeg		Brossoit	15,324	3–1
5	April 27	Winnipeg	1–4	Vegas		Brossoit	18,476	4–1

Western Conference Second Round vs. (P2) Edmonton Oilers: Vegas won 4–2
#	Date	Visitor	Score	Home	OT	Decision	Attendance	Series	Recap
1	May 3	Edmonton	4–6	Vegas		Brossoit	18,243	1–0
2	May 6	Edmonton	5–1	Vegas		Brossoit	18,504	1–1
3	May 8	Vegas	5–1	Edmonton		Hill	18,347	2–1
4	May 10	Vegas	1–4	Edmonton		Hill	18,347	2–2
5	May 12	Edmonton	3–4	Vegas		Hill	18,519	3–2
6	May 14	Vegas	5–2	Edmonton		Hill	18,347	4–2

Western Conference Final vs. (C2) Dallas Stars: Vegas won 4–2
#	Date	Visitor	Score	Home	OT	Decision	Attendance	Series	Recap
1	May 19	Dallas	3–4	Vegas	OT	Hill	18,271	1–0
2	May 21	Dallas	2–3	Vegas	OT	Hill	18,358	2–0
3	May 23	Vegas	4–0	Dallas		Hill	18,532	3–0
4	May 25	Vegas	2–3	Dallas	OT	Hill	18,532	3–1
5	May 27	Dallas	4–2	Vegas		Hill	18,546	3–2
6	May 29	Vegas	6–0	Dallas		Hill	18,532	4–2

Stanley Cup Final vs. (WC2) Florida Panthers: Vegas won 4–1
#	Date	Visitor	Score	Home	OT	Decision	Attendance	Series	Recap
1	June 3	Florida	2–5	Vegas		Hill	18,432	1–0
2	June 5	Florida	2–7	Vegas		Hill	18,561	2–0
3	June 8	Vegas	2–3	Florida	OT	Hill	19,735	2–1
4	June 10	Vegas	3–2	Florida		Hill	19,986	3–1
5	June 13	Florida	3–9	Vegas		Hill	19,058	4–1

Legend: Win Loss

== Player statistics ==
Updated to games played June 13, 2023

=== Skaters ===
Regular season
Player	GP	G	A	Pts	+/−	PIM
Jack Eichel	67	27	39	66	+26	6
Chandler Stephenson	81	16	49	65	+12	26
Jonathan Marchessault	76	28	29	57	+2	21
Reilly Smith	78	26	30	56	+11	16
Alex Pietrangelo	73	11	43	**54**	+13	16
William Karlsson	82	14	39	53	+14	10
Shea Theodore	55	8	33	41	+16	18
Mark Stone	43	17	21	38	+11	10
Phil Kessel	82	14	22	36	–7	30
Nicolas Roy	65	14	16	30	+10	24
Michael Amadio	67	16	11	27	+2	12
William Carrier	56	16	9	25	+15	30
Paul Cotter	55	13	5	18	–5	15
Keegan Kolesar	74	8	10	18	+6	68
Nicolas Hague	81	3	14	17	+7	51
Brayden McNabb	82	1	16	17	+17	51
Ivan Barbashev^{†}	23	6	10	16	+11	6
Alec Martinez	77	3	11	14	+30	29
Brett Howden	54	6	7	13	+5	55
Zach Whitecloud	59	5	7	12	+10	41
Pavel Dorofeyev	18	7	2	9	+5	6
Ben Hutton	31	3	5	8	+1	6
Daniil Miromanov	14	2	4	6	–6	2
Teddy Blueger^{†}	18	2	4	6	–2	14
Byron Froese	9	1	1	2	0	4
Kaedan Korczak	10	0	2	2	–3	0
Brayden Pachal	10	0	2	2	+2	8
Jonas Rondbjerg	13	0	1	1	–5	4
Sheldon Rempal	1	0	0	0	–2	0
Jake Leschyshyn^{‡}	22	0	0	0	–7	8

Playoffs
Player	GP	G	A	Pts	+/−	PIM
Jack Eichel	22	6	**20**	**26**	+14	14
Jonathan Marchessault	22	**13**	12	25	**+17**	14
Mark Stone	22	11	13	24	+5	8
Chandler Stephenson	22	10	10	20	+3	30
Ivan Barbashev	22	7	11	18	+14	18
William Karlsson	22	11	6	17	+11	2
Reilly Smith	22	4	10	14	+9	14
Shea Theodore	21	1	12	13	+8	10
Nicolas Roy	22	3	8	11	+2	20
Brett Howden	22	5	5	10	+4	31
Michael Amadio	16	5	5	10	+8	4
Alex Pietrangelo	21	1	9	10	+9	29
Zach Whitecloud	22	2	6	8	+14	21
Alec Martinez	22	2	5	7	+13	4
Nicolas Hague	22	2	4	6	+12	37
William Carrier	18	2	4	6	+2	26
Keegan Kolesar	22	2	3	5	+1	**50**
Brayden McNabb	21	0	4	4	+7	10
Teddy Blueger	6	1	1	2	+1	0
Phil Kessel	4	0	2	2	+2	2
Brayden Pachal	1	0	0	0	0	2
Ben Hutton	2	0	0	0	0	0

=== Goaltenders ===
Regular season
Player	GP	GS	TOI	W	L	OT	GA	GAA	SA	SV%	SO	G	A	PIM
Logan Thompson	37	36	2,171:22	21	13	3	96	2.65	1,132	.915	2	0	0	2
Adin Hill	27	25	1,490:54	16	7	1	62	2.50	729	.916	0	0	1	2
Laurent Brossoit	11	10	636:02	7	0	3	23	2.17	317	.927	0	0	0	0
Jonathan Quick^{†}	10	9	536:22	5	2	2	28	3.13	282	.901	1	0	0	2
Jiri Patera	2	2	120:00	2	0	0	5	2.50	70	.929	0	0	0	0

Playoffs
Player	GP	GS	TOI	W	L	GA	GAA	SA	SV%	SO	G	A	PIM
Adin Hill	16	14	913:20	11	4	33	2.17	488	**.932**	2	0	0	2
Laurent Brossoit	8	8	433:22	5	2	23	3.18	216	.894	0	0	0	0

^{†}Denotes player spent time with another team before joining the Golden Knights. Stats reflect time with the Golden Knights only.
^{‡}Denotes player was traded or waived mid-season. Stats reflect time with the Golden Knights only.
Bold denotes new franchise record.

== Transactions ==
The Golden Knights have been involved in the following transactions during the 2022–23 season.

=== Trades ===
* Retained Salary Transaction: Each team is allowed up to three contracts on their payroll where they have retained salary in a trade (i.e. the player no longer plays with Team A due to a trade to Team B, but Team A still retains some salary). Only up to 50% of a player's contract can be kept, and only up to 15% of a team's salary cap can be taken up by retained salary. A contract can only be involved in one of these trades twice.

Date	Details		Ref
July 8, 2022	To Toronto Maple Leafs NYR 3rd-round pick in 2022; CHI 5th-round pick in 2022	To Vegas Golden Knights WPG 3rd-round pick in 2022	
July 8, 2022	To Montreal Canadiens 4th-round pick in 2023	To Vegas Golden Knights TBL 4th-round pick in 2022	
July 13, 2022	To Carolina Hurricanes Max Pacioretty; Dylan Coghlan	To Vegas Golden Knights Future considerations	
August 29, 2022	To San Jose Sharks 4th-round pick in 2024	To Vegas Golden Knights Adin Hill	
November 30, 2022	To Carolina Hurricanes Zack Hayes	To Vegas Golden Knights Future considerations	
February 22, 2023	To Arizona Coyotes Shea Weber; 5th-round pick in 2023	To Vegas Golden Knights Dysin Mayo	
February 26, 2023	To St. Louis Blues Zach Dean	To Vegas Golden Knights Ivan Barbashev	
March 1, 2023	To Pittsburgh Penguins Peter DiLiberatore; 3rd-round pick in 2024	To Vegas Golden Knights Teddy Blueger	
March 2, 2023	To Columbus Blue Jackets Michael Hutchinson; 7th-round pick in 2025	To Vegas Golden Knights Jonathan Quick*	

=== Players acquired ===
Date	Player	Former team	Term	Via	Ref
July 13, 2022	Byron Froese	Calgary Flames	2-year	Free agency	
July 13, 2022	Michael Hutchinson	Toronto Maple Leafs	1-year	Free agency	
July 13, 2022	Sheldon Rempal	Vancouver Canucks	2-year	Free agency	
July 14, 2022	Spencer Foo	Kunlun Red Star (KHL)	1-year	Free agency	
July 14, 2022	Sakari Manninen	Salavat Yulaev Ufa (KHL)	1-year	Free agency	
August 24, 2022	Phil Kessel	Arizona Coyotes	1-year	Free agency	
September 29, 2022	Joe Fleming	Cedar Rapids RoughRiders (USHL)	3-year†	Free agency	
March 2, 2023	Christoffer Sedoff	Red Deer Rebels (WHL)	3-year†‡	Free agency	
Legend: † Contract is entry-level. ‡ Contract begins in 2023–24 season.

=== Players lost ===
Date	Player	New team	Term	Via	Ref
July 14, 2022	Jake Bischoff	Henderson Silver Knights (AHL)	1-year	Free agency	
July 14, 2022	Gage Quinney	Henderson Silver Knights (AHL)	1-year	Free agency	
July 15, 2022	Jack Dugan	New Jersey Devils	1-year	Free agency	
July 17, 2022	Mattias Janmark	Edmonton Oilers	1-year	Free agency	
July 21, 2022	Ben Jones	Calgary Flames	1-year	Free agency	
January 11, 2023	Jake Leschyshyn	New York Rangers		Waivers	
February 20, 2023	Dylan Ferguson	Toronto Marlies (AHL)	1-year	Free agency	
May 12, 2023	Sakari Manninen	Geneve-Servette HC (NL)	1-year‡	Free agency	
Legend: ‡ Contract begins in 2023–24 season.

=== Signings ===
Date	Player	Term	Ref
July 13, 2022	Brett Howden	1-year	
July 13, 2022	Reilly Smith	3-year	
July 13, 2022	Jonas Rondbjerg	3-year	
July 28, 2022	Brayden Pachal	1-year	
August 5, 2022	Keegan Kolesar	3-year	
August 8, 2022	Nicolas Roy	5-year	
August 13, 2022	Paul Cotter	3-year	
August 13, 2022	Jake Leschyshyn	3-year	
October 10, 2022	Nicolas Hague	3-year	
December 10, 2022	Jakub Brabenec	3-year†	
December 26, 2022	Matyas Sapovaliv	3-year†	
April 10, 2023	Jesper Vikman	3-year†‡	
June 1, 2023	Carl Lindbom	3-year†	
Legend: † Contract is entry-level. ‡ Contract begins in 2023–24 season.

== Draft picks ==
Below are the Vegas Golden Knights' selections at the 2022 NHL entry draft, which was held on July 7 to 8, 2022, at Bell Centre in Montreal.

Round	#	Player	Pos.	Nationality	Team (League)
2	48	Matyas Sapovaliv	C	Czech Republic	Saginaw Spirit (OHL)
3	79	Jordan Gustafson	C	Canada	Seattle Thunderbirds (WHL)
4	128	Cameron Whitehead	G	Canada	Lincoln Stars (USHL)
5	145	Patrick Guay	C	Canada	Charlottetown Islanders (QMJHL)
6	177	Ben Hemmerling	RW	Canada	Everett Silvertips (WHL)
7	209	Abram Wiebe	D	Canada	Chilliwack Chiefs (BCHL)
