= 2022–23 New York Rangers season =

National Hockey League season

2022–23 New York Rangers
- Division: 3rd Metropolitan
- Conference: 5th Eastern
- 2022–23 record: 47–22–13
- Home record: 23–13–5
- Road record: 24–9–8
- Goals for: 277
- Goals against: 219

Team information
- General manager: Chris Drury
- Coach: Gerard Gallant
- Captain: Jacob Trouba
- Alternate captains: Barclay Goodrow; Chris Kreider; Artemi Panarin; Mika Zibanejad
- Arena: Madison Square Garden
- Average attendance: 17,859
- Minor league affiliates: Hartford Wolf Pack (AHL); Jacksonville Icemen (ECHL)

Team leaders
- Goals: Mika Zibanejad (39)
- Assists: Artemi Panarin (63)
- Points: Artemi Panarin (92)
- Penalty minutes: Jacob Trouba (63)
- Plus/minus: Ryan Lindgren (+29)
- Wins: Igor Shesterkin (37)
- Goals against average: Igor Shesterkin (2.48)

The 2022–23 New York Rangers season was the franchise's 96th season of play and their 97th season overall.

During the off-season, the Rangers named Jacob Trouba the 28th captain in franchise history. Trouba became the first captain since Ryan McDonagh was traded during the 2017–18 season, and is also the 12th defenseman in franchise history to be named captain. He is the fourth consecutive U.S.-born player to be named captain after Chris Drury (2008–2011), Ryan Callahan (2011–2014) and McDonagh (2014–2018). Trouba served as an alternate captain the previous two years, while being lauded for his leadership abilities by previous Rangers head coach, David Quinn, and his successor, Gerard Gallant.

On March 14, 2023, the Rangers were featured in the first-ever live, animated NHL telecast called the "NHL Big City Greens Classic". ESPN, Disney Channel and the National Hockey League teamed up to showcase ice hockey to a younger audience. They defeated the Washington Capitals in a game that featured characters from the award-winning cartoon playing for both teams. The Rangers clinched a playoff berth on March 27, after losses by the Buffalo Sabres and Florida Panthers. In the first round of the 2023 Stanley Cup playoffs, the Rangers, despite leading the series 2–0, were eliminated by the New Jersey Devils in seven games.

Head coach Gallant resigned from his duties after the Rangers' elimination from the playoffs.

== Standings ==
=== Divisional standings ===
Metropolitan Division
Pos	Team	GP	W	L	OTL	RW	GF	GA	GD	Pts
1	y – Carolina Hurricanes	82	52	21	9	39	266	213	+53	113
2	x – New Jersey Devils	82	52	22	8	39	291	226	+65	112
3	x – New York Rangers	82	47	22	13	37	277	219	+58	107
4	x – New York Islanders	82	42	31	9	36	243	222	+21	93
5	Pittsburgh Penguins	82	40	31	11	31	262	264	−2	91
6	Washington Capitals	82	35	37	10	27	255	265	−10	80
7	Philadelphia Flyers	82	31	38	13	26	222	277	−55	75
8	Columbus Blue Jackets	82	25	48	9	15	214	330	−116	59

Source: National Hockey League
Rules for classification: 1) Fewer number of games played (GP, only during regular season); 2) Greater number of regulation wins (RW); 3) Greater number of wins in regulation and overtime, excluding shootout wins (ROW); 4) Greater number of total wins, including shootouts (W); 5) Greater number of points earned in head-to-head play; if teams played an uneven number of head-to-head games, the result of the first game on the home ice of the team with the extra home game is discarded; 6) Greater goal differential (GD); 7) Greater number of goals scored (GF)
x – Clinched playoff spot; y – Clinched division

=== Conference standings ===
Eastern Conference Wild Card
Pos	Div	Team	GP	W	L	OTL	RW	GF	GA	GD	Pts
1	ME	x – New York Islanders	82	42	31	9	36	243	222	+21	93
2	AT	x – Florida Panthers	82	42	32	8	36	290	273	+17	92
3	ME	Pittsburgh Penguins	82	40	31	11	31	262	264	−2	91
4	AT	Buffalo Sabres	82	42	33	7	30	296	300	−4	91
5	AT	Ottawa Senators	82	39	35	8	31	261	271	−10	86
6	AT	Detroit Red Wings	82	35	37	10	28	240	279	−39	80
7	ME	Washington Capitals	82	35	37	10	27	255	265	−10	80
8	ME	Philadelphia Flyers	82	31	38	13	26	222	277	−55	75
9	AT	Montreal Canadiens	82	31	45	6	21	232	307	−75	68
10	ME	Columbus Blue Jackets	82	25	48	9	15	214	330	−116	59

Source: National Hockey League
Rules for classification: 1) Fewer number of games played (GP, only during regular season); 2) Greater number of regulation wins (RW); 3) Greater number of wins in regulation and overtime, excluding shootout wins (ROW); 4) Greater number of total wins, including shootouts (W); 5) Greater number of points earned in head-to-head play; if teams played an uneven number of head-to-head games, the result of the first game on the home ice of the team with the extra home game is discarded; 6) Greater goal differential (GD); 7) Greater number of goals scored (GF)
x – Clinched playoff spot

== Schedule and results ==
=== Pre-season ===
The pre-season schedule was published on June 27, 2022.

2022 pre-season game log: 2–3–1 (home: 1–2–0; road: 1–1–1)

Game	Date	Opponent	Score	OT	Decision	Location	Attendance	Record	Recap
1	September 26	NY Islanders	4–1		Shesterkin	Madison Square Garden	14,776	1–0–0	
2	September 27	@ Boston	2–3	OT	Domingue	TD Garden	17,850	1–0–1	
3	September 29	New Jersey	2–5		Shesterkin	Madison Square Garden	14,237	1–1–1	
4	September 30	@ New Jersey	2–1		Halák	Prudential Center	11,068	2–1–1	
5	October 5	Boston	4–5		Halák	Madison Square Garden	13,759	2–2–1	
6	October 8	@ NY Islanders	1–3		Shesterkin	UBS Arena	14,569	2–3–1	

=== Regular season ===
The regular season schedule was published on July 6, 2022.

2022–23 game log
October: 5–3–2, 12 points (home: 2–1–2; road: 3–2–0)

Game	Date	Opponent	Score	OT	Decision	Location	Attendance	Record	Points	Recap
1	October 11	Tampa Bay	3–1		Shesterkin	Madison Square Garden	18,006	1–0–0	2	
2	October 13	@ Minnesota	7–3		Shesterkin	Xcel Energy Center	18,612	2–0–0	4	
3	October 14	@ Winnipeg	1–4		Halák	Canada Life Centre	14,553	2–1–0	4	
4	October 17	Anaheim	6–4		Shesterkin	Madison Square Garden	18,006	3–1–0	6	
5	October 20	San Jose	2–3	OT	Shesterkin	Madison Square Garden	17,083	3–1–1	7	
6	October 23	Columbus	1–5		Halák	Madison Square Garden	18,006	3–2–1	7	
7	October 25	Colorado	2–3	SO	Shesterkin	Madison Square Garden	18,006	3–2–2	8	
8	October 26	@ NY Islanders	0–3		Halák	UBS Arena	17,255	3–3–2	8	
9	October 29	@ Dallas	6–3		Shesterkin	American Airlines Center	18,532	4–3–2	10	
10	October 30	@ Arizona	3–2		Shesterkin	Mullett Arena	4,600	5–3–2	12	

November: 6–6–2, 14 points (home: 2–4–1; road: 4–2–1)

Game	Date	Opponent	Score	OT	Decision	Location	Attendance	Record	Points	Recap
11	November 1	Philadelphia	1–0	OT	Shesterkin	Madison Square Garden	17,206	6–3–2	14	
12	November 3	Boston	2–5		Shesterkin	Madison Square Garden	18,006	6–4–2	14	
13	November 6	Detroit	2–3	OT	Halák	Madison Square Garden	18,006	6–4–3	15	
14	November 8	NY Islanders	3–4		Shesterkin	Madison Square Garden	18,006	6–5–3	15	
15	November 10	@ Detroit	8–2		Shesterkin	Little Caesars Arena	18,869	7–5–3	17	
16	November 12	@ Nashville	1–2		Halák	Bridgestone Arena	17,169	7–6–3	17	
17	November 13	Arizona	4–1		Shesterkin	Madison Square Garden	18,006	8–6–3	19	
18	November 17	@ Seattle	2–3	OT	Shesterkin	Climate Pledge Arena	17,151	8–6–4	20	
19	November 19	@ San Jose	2–1		Shesterkin	SAP Center	17,562	9–6–4	22	
20	November 22	@ Los Angeles	5–3		Shesterkin	Crypto.com Arena	18,230	10–6–4	24	
21	November 23	@ Anaheim	2–3		Halák	Honda Center	13,759	10–7–4	24	
22	November 26	Edmonton	3–4		Shesterkin	Madison Square Garden	18,006	10–8–4	24	
23	November 28	New Jersey	3–5		Shesterkin	Madison Square Garden	17,928	10–9–4	24	
24	November 30	@ Ottawa	3–1		Halák	Canadian Tire Centre	14,654	11–9–4	26	

December: 8–3–2, 18 points (home: 4–2–1; road: 4–1–1)

Game	Date	Opponent	Score	OT	Decision	Location	Attendance	Record	Points	Recap
25	December 2	Ottawa	2–3	OT	Shesterkin	Madison Square Garden	18,006	11–9–5	27	
26	December 3	Chicago	2–5		Halák	Madison Square Garden	18,006	11–10–5	27	
27	December 5	St. Louis	6–4		Shesterkin	Madison Square Garden	16,682	12–10–5	29	
28	December 7	@ Vegas	5–1		Shesterkin	T-Mobile Arena	17,939	13–10–5	31	
29	December 9	@ Colorado	2–1	SO	Shesterkin	Ball Arena	18,112	14–10–5	33	
30	December 12	New Jersey	4–3	OT	Shesterkin	Madison Square Garden	18,006	15–10–5	35	
31	December 15	Toronto	3–1		Shesterkin	Madison Square Garden	18,006	16–10–5	37	
32	December 17	@ Philadelphia	6–3		Halák	Wells Fargo Center	18,340	17–10–5	39	
33	December 18	@ Chicago	7–1		Shesterkin	United Center	17,365	18–10–5	41	
34	December 20	@ Pittsburgh	2–3		Shesterkin	PPG Paints Arena	18,005	18–11–5	41	
35	December 22	NY Islanders	5–3		Shesterkin	Madison Square Garden	18,006	19–11–5	43	
36	December 27	Washington	0–4		Shesterkin	Madison Square Garden	18,006	19–12–5	43	
37	December 29	@ Tampa Bay	1–2	SO	Shesterkin	Amalie Arena	19,092	19–12–6	44	

January: 8–2–2, 18 points (home: 5–2–0; road: 3–0–2)

Game	Date	Opponent	Score	OT	Decision	Location	Attendance	Record	Points	Recap
38	January 1	@ Florida	5–3		Halák	FLA Live Arena	18,272	20–12–6	46	
39	January 3	Carolina	5–3		Shesterkin	Madison Square Garden	17,747	21–12–6	48	
40	January 5	@ Montreal	4–1		Halák	Bell Centre	21,105	22–12–6	50	
41	January 7	@ New Jersey	3–4	OT	Shesterkin	Prudential Center	16,514	22–12–7	51	
42	January 10	Minnesota	4–3	SO	Shesterkin	Madison Square Garden	18,006	23–12–7	53	
43	January 12	Dallas	2–1	OT	Shesterkin	Madison Square Garden	18,006	24–12–7	55	
44	January 15	Montreal	1–2		Shesterkin	Madison Square Garden	18,006	24–13–7	55	
45	January 16	@ Columbus	3–1		Halák	Nationwide Arena	17,024	25–13–7	57	
46	January 19	Boston	1–3		Shesterkin	Madison Square Garden	18,006	25–14–7	57	
47	January 23	Florida	6–2		Shesterkin	Madison Square Garden	17,121	26–14–7	59	
48	January 25	@ Toronto	2–3	OT	Shesterkin	Scotiabank Arena	18,114	26–14–8	60	
49	January 27	Vegas	4–1		Halák	Madison Square Garden	18,006	27–14–8	62	

February: 7–3–1, 15 points (home: 4–1–0; road: 3–2–1)

Game	Date	Opponent	Score	OT	Decision	Location	Attendance	Record	Points	Recap
50	February 6	Calgary	5–4	OT	Halák	Madison Square Garden	17,173	28–14–8	64	
51	February 8	Vancouver	4–3		Shesterkin	Madison Square Garden	18,006	29–14–8	66	
52	February 10	Seattle	6–3		Shesterkin	Madison Square Garden	18,006	30–14–8	68	
53	February 11	@ Carolina	6–2		Halák	PNC Arena	18,808	31–14–8	70	
54	February 15	@ Vancouver	6–4		Shesterkin	Rogers Arena	18,404	32–14–8	72	
55	February 17	@ Edmonton	5–4	SO	Shesterkin	Rogers Place	18,347	33–14–8	74	
56	February 18	@ Calgary	2–3	OT	Halák	Scotiabank Saddledome	19,206	33–14–9	75	
57	February 20	Winnipeg	1–4		Shesterkin	Madison Square Garden	18,006	33–15–9	75	
58	February 23	@ Detroit	1–4		Halák	Little Caesars Arena	19,116	33–16–9	75	
59	February 25	@ Washington	3–6		Shesterkin	Capital One Arena	18,573	33–17–9	75	
60	February 26	Los Angeles	5–2		Shesterkin	Madison Square Garden	18,006	34–17–9	77	

March: 10–4–2, 21 points (home: 5–2–0; road: 5–2–2)

Game	Date	Opponent	Score	OT	Decision	Location	Attendance	Record	Points	Recap
61	March 1	@ Philadelphia	3–2	OT	Shesterkin	Wells Fargo Center	19,534	35–17–9	79	
62	March 2	Ottawa	3–5		Halák	Madison Square Garden	18,006	35–18–9	79	
63	March 4	@ Boston	2–4		Shesterkin	TD Garden	17,850	35–19–9	79	
64	March 9	@ Montreal	4–3	SO	Shesterkin	Bell Centre	21,105	36–19–9	81	
65	March 11	@ Buffalo	2–1	OT	Shesterkin	KeyBank Center	19,070	37–19–9	83	
66	March 12	@ Pittsburgh	2–3	OT	Halák	PPG Paints Arena	18,364	37–19–10	84	
67	March 14	Washington	5–3		Shesterkin	Madison Square Garden	17,476	38–19–10	86	
68	March 16	Pittsburgh	4–2		Shesterkin	Madison Square Garden	18,006	39–19–10	88	
69	March 18	Pittsburgh	6–0		Shesterkin	Madison Square Garden	18,006	40–19–10	90	
70	March 19	Nashville	7–0		Halák	Madison Square Garden	18,006	41–19–10	92	
71	March 21	Carolina	2–3		Shesterkin	Madison Square Garden	18,006	41–20–10	92	
72	March 23	@ Carolina	2–1		Shesterkin	PNC Arena	18,792	42–20–10	94	
73	March 25	@ Florida	4–3		Halák	FLA Live Arena	18,635	43–20–10	96	
74	March 28	Columbus	6–2		Shesterkin	Madison Square Garden	18,006	44–20–10	98	
75	March 30	@ New Jersey	1–2		Shesterkin	Prudential Center	16,669	44–21–10	98	
76	March 31	@ Buffalo	2–3	OT	Halák	KeyBank Center	18,009	44–21–11	99	

April: 3–1–2, 8 points (home: 1–1–1; road: 2–0–1)

Game	Date	Opponent	Score	OT	Decision	Location	Attendance	Record	Points	Recap
77	April 2	@ Washington	5–2		Shesterkin	Capital One Arena	18,573	45–21–11	101	
78	April 5	Tampa Bay	6–3		Shesterkin	Madison Square Garden	18,006	46–21–11	103	
79	April 6	@ St. Louis	2–3	OT	Halák	Enterprise Center	18,096	46–21–12	104	
80	April 8	@ Columbus	4–0		Shesterkin	Nationwide Arena	18,824	47–21–12	106	
81	April 10	Buffalo	2–3	SO	Shesterkin	Madison Square Garden	18,006	47–21–13	107	
82	April 13	Toronto	2–3		Halák	Madison Square Garden	17,623	47–22–13	107	

Win (2 points) Loss (0 points) Overtime/shootout loss (1 point)

=== Playoffs ===
The Rangers faced the New Jersey Devils in the first round.

2023 Stanley Cup playoffs
Eastern Conference first round vs. (M2) New Jersey Devils: New Jersey won 4–3

Game	Date	Opponent	Score	OT	Decision	Location	Attendance	Series	Recap
1	April 18	@ New Jersey	5–1		Shesterkin	Prudential Center	16,514	1–0	
2	April 20	@ New Jersey	5–1		Shesterkin	Prudential Center	16,760	2–0	
3	April 22	New Jersey	1–2	OT	Shesterkin	Madison Square Garden	18,006	2–1	
4	April 24	New Jersey	1–3		Shesterkin	Madison Square Garden	18,006	2–2	
5	April 27	@ New Jersey	0–4		Shesterkin	Prudential Center	17,114	2–3	
6	April 29	New Jersey	5–2		Shesterkin	Madison Square Garden	18,006	3–3	
7	May 1	@ New Jersey	0–4		Shesterkin	Prudential Center	17,241	3–4	

Win Loss

== Player statistics ==
As of May 1, 2023

=== Skaters ===
Regular season
Player	GP	G	A	Pts	+/−	PIM
Artemi Panarin	82	29	63	92	+4	36
Mika Zibanejad	82	39	52	91	+25	20
Adam Fox	82	12	60	72	+28	34
Vincent Trocheck	82	22	42	64	+3	58
Chris Kreider	79	36	18	54	+21	26
Filip Chytil	74	22	23	45	+15	30
K'Andre Miller	79	9	34	43	+12	47
Kaapo Kakko	82	18	22	40	+12	8
Alexis Lafrenière	81	16	23	39	+10	33
Barclay Goodrow	82	11	20	31	+3	58
Jacob Trouba	82	8	22	30	+7	63
Jimmy Vesey	81	11	14	25	+13	20
Vladimir Tarasenko^{†}	31	8	13	21	+4	0
Braden Schneider	81	5	13	18	+9	16
Ryan Lindgren	63	1	17	18	+29	45
Patrick Kane^{†}	19	5	7	12	+1	6
Tyler Motte^{†}	24	5	5	10	+2	2
Julien Gauthier^{‡}	40	6	3	9	–5	4
Vitali Kravtsov^{‡}	28	3	3	6	+6	6
Ben Harpur	42	1	5	6	0	20
Samuel Blais^{‡}	40	0	5	5	+1	8
Niko Mikkola^{†}	31	1	2	3	+4	23
Ryan Carpenter	22	1	2	3	–5	10
Zac Jones	16	1	1	2	–2	4
Jonny Brodzinski	17	1	1	2	+3	8
Libor Hájek	16	1	0	1	+2	4
Dryden Hunt	3	1	0	1	–1	2
Will Cuylle	4	0	0	0	–2	10
Jake Leschyshyn	13	0	0	0	–3	0
Ryan Reaves^{‡}	12	0	0	0	–5	12

Playoffs
Player	GP	G	A	Pts	+/−	PIM
Chris Kreider	7	6	3	9	–2	0
Adam Fox	7	0	8	8	0	16
Patrick Kane	7	1	5	6	0	6
Vladimir Tarasenko	7	3	1	4	–1	2
Filip Chytil	7	1	3	4	+4	0
Mika Zibanejad	7	1	3	4	–1	6
Kaapo Kakko	7	1	1	2	+1	0
Ryan Lindgren	7	1	1	2	+3	6
Niko Mikkola	7	0	2	2	+2	12
Artemi Panarin	7	0	2	2	–2	2
Braden Schneider	7	1	0	1	0	9
Barclay Goodrow	7	1	0	1	–2	29
Vincent Trocheck	7	1	0	1	0	14
K'Andre Miller	7	0	1	1	0	4
Jimmy Vesey	7	0	1	1	+1	10
Alexis Lafrenière	7	0	0	0	0	0
Tyler Motte	7	0	0	0	–1	12
Jacob Trouba	7	0	0	0	–1	6

=== Goaltenders ===
Regular season
Player	GP	GS	TOI	W	L	OT	GA	GAA	SA	SV%	SO	G	A	PIM
Igor Shesterkin	58	58	3,488:46	37	13	8	144	2.48	1,719	.916	3	0	1	2
Jaroslav Halák	25	24	1,453:56	10	9	5	66	2.72	680	.903	1	0	1	0

Playoffs
Player	GP	GS	TOI	W	L	GA	GAA	SA	SV%	SO	G	A	PIM
Igor Shesterkin	7	7	427:38	3	4	14	1.96	203	.931	0	0	0	2

- ^{†} Denotes player spent time with another team before joining the Rangers. Stats reflect time with the Rangers only.
- ^{‡} Denotes player was traded mid-season. Stats reflect time with the Rangers only.
- Bold/italics denotes franchise record.

== Awards and honors ==
=== Awards ===
Regular season
Player	Award	Date
Jacob Trouba	Mr. Ranger Award	April 5, 2023
Ryan Lindgren	Steven McDonald Extra Effort Award	April 10, 2023
Ryan Lindgren	Players' Player Award	April 12, 2023
Mika Zibanejad	Rangers MVP	April 12, 2023

=== Milestones ===
Regular season
Player	Milestone	Reached
Mika Zibanejad	700th NHL career game	November 10, 2022
Artemi Panarin	600th NHL career point	December 7, 2022
Will Cuylle	1st NHL career game	January 25, 2023
Chris Kreider	700th NHL career game	January 27, 2023
K'Andre Miller	1st NHL career three-point game	February 8, 2023
Chris Kreider	250th NHL career goal	February 8, 2023
Artemi Panarin	1st NHL career four-goal game	February 11, 2023
Filip Chytil	300th NHL career game	February 17, 2023
Patrick Kane	400th NHL career power play point	March 14, 2023
Patrick Kane	450th NHL career goal	March 25, 2023
Mika Zibanejad	600th NHL career point	April 5, 2023
Jimmy Vesey	500th NHL career game	April 6, 2023
Braden Schneider	1st NHL career postseason goal	April 29, 2023

=== Records ===
Regular season
Player	Record	Reached
Chris Kreider	8th place in Rangers history for all-time goals (247)	January 5, 2023
Mika Zibanejad	6th place in Rangers history for all-time power play goals (84)	February 10, 2023
Chris Kreider	7th place in Rangers history for all-time goals (251)	February 15, 2023
Chris Kreider	Tied for 5th place in Rangers history for all-time goals (262)	March 30, 2023
Chris Kreider	5th place in Rangers history for all-time goals (263)	April 5, 2023

== Transactions ==
The Rangers have been involved in the following transactions during the 2022–23 season.

=== Trades ===
Date	Details		Ref
July 7, 2022	To Colorado Avalanche Alexandar Georgiev	To New York Rangers 3rd-round pick in 2022; 5th-round pick in 2022; 3rd-round pick in 2023	
July 13, 2022	To Arizona Coyotes Patrik Nemeth; 2nd-round pick in 2025; Conditional 2nd-round pick in 2026	To New York Rangers Ty Emberson	
September 19, 2022	To Dallas Stars Nils Lundkvist	To New York Rangers Conditional 1st-round pick in 2023; Conditional 4th-round pick in 2025	
November 23, 2022	To Minnesota Wild Ryan Reaves	To New York Rangers 5th-round pick in 2025	
February 9, 2023	To St. Louis Blues Samuel Blais; Hunter Skinner; Conditional 1st-round pick in 2023; Conditional 4th-round pick in 2024	To New York Rangers Niko Mikkola; Vladimir Tarasenko	
February 19, 2023	To Ottawa Senators Julien Gauthier; Conditional 7th-round pick in 2023	To New York Rangers Tyler Motte	
February 25, 2023	To Vancouver Canucks Vitali Kravtsov	To New York Rangers Will Lockwood; 7th-round pick in 2026	
February 28, 2023	To Chicago Blackhawks Vili Saarijärvi; Andy Welinski; Conditional 2nd-round pick in 2023; 4th-round pick in 2025	To New York Rangers Patrick Kane; Cooper Zech	
February 28, 2023	To Arizona Coyotes Conditional 3rd-round pick in 2025	To New York Rangers Patrick Kane; Cooper Zech	
February 28, 2023	To Nashville Predators Austin Rueschhoff	To New York Rangers Future considerations	
March 3, 2023	To Colorado Avalanche Gustav Rydahl	To New York Rangers Anton Blidh	
March 3, 2023	To Vancouver Canucks Future considerations	To New York Rangers Wyatt Kalynuk	
May 31, 2023	To Edmonton Oilers Jayden Grubbe	To New York Rangers 5th-round pick in 2023	

=== Free agents ===
Date	Player	Team	Contract term	Ref
July 13, 2022	Justin Braun	to Philadelphia Flyers	1-year	
July 13, 2022	Andrew Copp	to Detroit Red Wings	5-year	
July 13, 2022	Louis Domingue	from Pittsburgh Penguins	2-year	
July 13, 2022	Jaroslav Halák	from Vancouver Canucks	1-year	
July 13, 2022	Keith Kinkaid	to Boston Bruins	1-year	
July 13, 2022	Greg McKegg	to Edmonton Oilers	2-year	
July 13, 2022	Kevin Rooney	to Calgary Flames	2-year	
July 13, 2022	Ryan Strome	to Anaheim Ducks	5-year	
July 13, 2022	Vincent Trocheck	from Carolina Hurricanes	7-year	
July 13, 2022	Frank Vatrano	to Anaheim Ducks	3-year	
July 14, 2022	Ryan Carpenter	from Calgary Flames	1-year	
July 18, 2022	Turner Elson	from Detroit Red Wings	2-year	
July 18, 2022	Andy Welinski	from Calgary Flames (Note: Was under contract with the Flames, but played for their AHL affiliate during the 2021–22 season.)	1-year	
July 21, 2022	Ty Ronning	to Iowa Wild (AHL)	1-year	
August 1, 2022	Nick Merkley	to HC Dinamo Minsk (KHL)	1-year	
August 2, 2022	C. J. Smith	from Carolina Hurricanes	1-year	
August 23, 2022	Adam Húska	to Torpedo Nizhny Novgorod (KHL)	1-year	
August 29, 2022	Justin Richards	to Cleveland Monsters (AHL)	1-year	
September 12, 2022	Maxim Letunov	to Torpedo Nizhny Novgorod (KHL)	1-year	
September 14, 2022	Tyler Motte	to Ottawa Senators	1-year	
October 7, 2022	Jake Elmer	to Greenville Swamp Rabbits (ECHL)	1-year	
October 9, 2022	Jimmy Vesey	from New Jersey Devils	1-year	
October 11, 2022	Tyler Wall	to South Carolina Stingrays (ECHL)	1-year	
October 27, 2022	Ben Harpur	from Hartford Wolf Pack (AHL)	1-year	
May 23, 2023	Lauri Pajuniemi	to Malmö Redhawks (SHL)	1-year	
June 9, 2023	Cooper Zech	to HC Košice (Slovak Extraliga)	1-year	

=== Waivers ===
Date	Player	Team	Ref
October 10, 2022	Jarred Tinordi	to Chicago Blackhawks	
October 20, 2022	Dryden Hunt	to Colorado Avalanche	
January 11, 2023	Jake Leschyshyn	from Vegas Golden Knights	

=== Signings ===
Date	Player	Contract term	Ref
July 12, 2022	Libor Hájek	1-year	
July 15, 2022	Adam Sýkora	3-year	
July 18, 2022	Austin Rueschhoff	1-year	
July 22, 2022	Tim Gettinger	1-year	
July 28, 2022	Kaapo Kakko	2-year	
October 11, 2022	Talyn Boyko	3-year	
January 4, 2023	Jimmy Vesey	2-year	
January 26, 2023	Ben Harpur	2-year	
March 21, 2023	Brett Berard	3-year	
March 23, 2023	Bryce McConnell-Barker	3-year	
March 29, 2023	Filip Chytil	4-year	
June 8, 2023	Anton Blidh	2-year	
June 16, 2023	Zac Jones	2-year	

== Draft picks ==
Below are the New York Rangers' selections at the 2022 NHL entry draft, which was held on July 7 and 8, 2022, at Bell Centre in Montreal.

Round	#	Player	Pos	Nationality	College/junior/club team
2	63	Adam Sýkora	LW	Slovakia	HK Nitra (Tipos Extraliga)
3	97^{1}	Bryce McConnell-Barker	LW	Canada	Sault Ste. Marie Greyhounds (OHL)
4	111^{2}	Noah Laba	C	United States	Lincoln Stars (USHL)
5	159	Victor Mancini	D	United States	Omaha (NCHC)
5	161^{3}	Maxim Barbashev	LW	Russia	Moncton Wildcats (QMJHL)
6	191	Zakary Karpa	C	United States	Harvard (ECAC Hockey)

1. The Colorado Avalanche's third-round pick went to the New York Rangers as the result of a trade on July 7, 2022, that sent Alexandar Georgiev to Colorado in exchange for a third-round pick in 2023, a fifth-round pick in 2022 and this pick.
2. The Winnipeg Jets' fourth-round pick went to the New York Rangers as the result of a trade on July 17, 2021, that sent Brett Howden to the Vegas Golden Knights in exchange for Nick DeSimone and this pick.
3. The Colorado Avalanche's fifth-round pick went to the New York Rangers as the result of a trade on July 7, 2022, that sent Alexandar Georgiev to Colorado in exchange for a third-round pick in both 2022 and 2023 and this pick.
