= 2022–23 Tampa Bay Lightning season =

National Hockey League season

2022–23 Tampa Bay Lightning
- Division: 3rd Atlantic
- Conference: 6th Eastern
- 2022–23 record: 46–30–6
- Home record: 28–8–5
- Road record: 18–22–1
- Goals for: 283
- Goals against: 254

Team information
- General manager: Julien BriseBois
- Coach: Jon Cooper
- Captain: Steven Stamkos
- Alternate captains: Victor Hedman; Alex Killorn; Nikita Kucherov
- Arena: Amalie Arena
- Average attendance: 19,092
- Minor league affiliates: Syracuse Crunch (AHL); Orlando Solar Bears (ECHL)

Team leaders
- Goals: Brayden Point (51)
- Assists: Nikita Kucherov (83)
- Points: Nikita Kucherov (113)
- Penalty minutes: Patrick Maroon (150)
- Plus/minus: Brandon Hagel (+23)
- Wins: Andrei Vasilevskiy (34)
- Goals against average: Andrei Vasilevskiy (2.65)

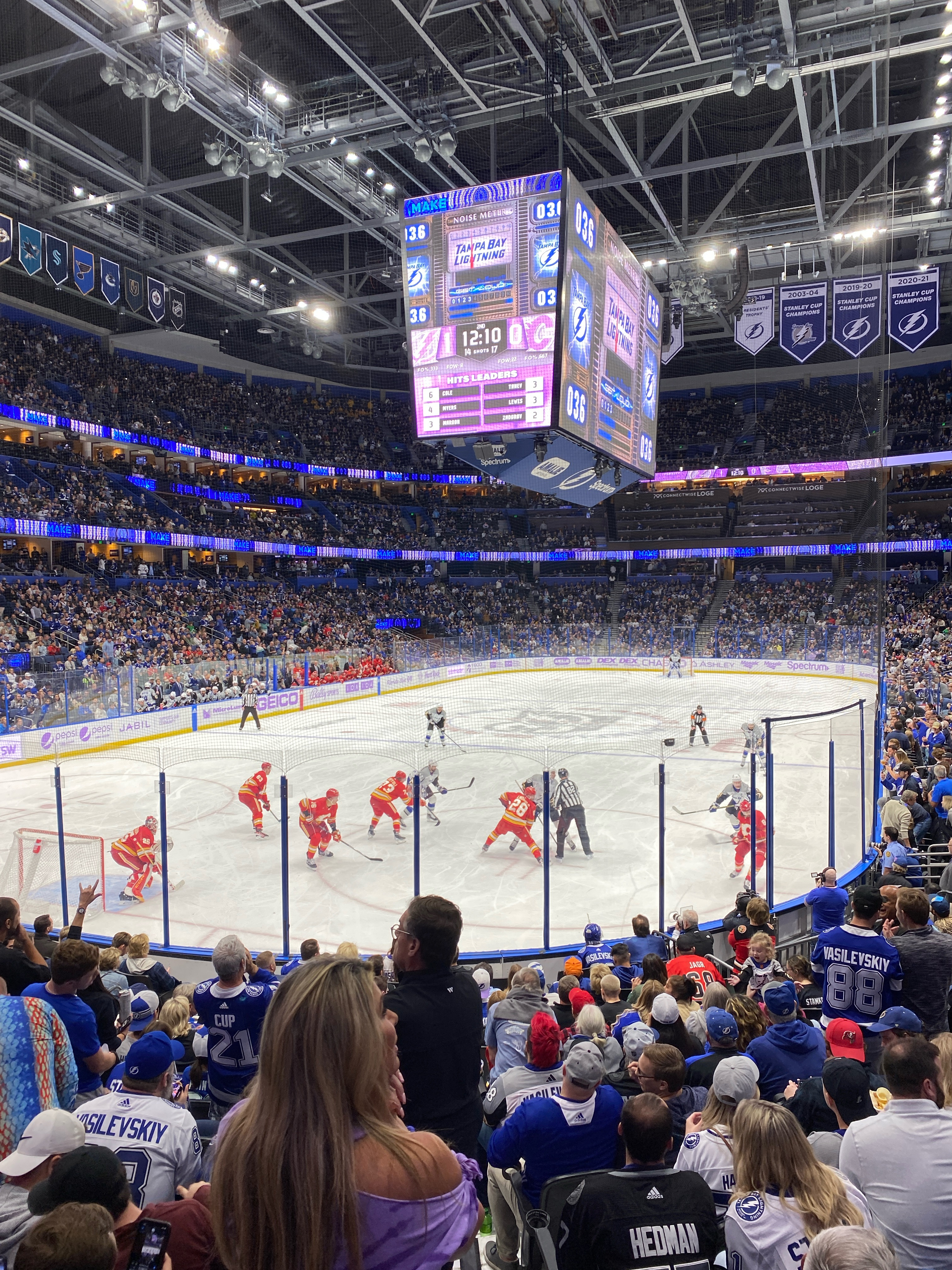
The Lightning face the Calgary Flames in November 2022.

The 2022–23 Tampa Bay Lightning season was the 31st season for the National Hockey League (NHL) franchise that was established on December 16, 1991. They entered this season as defending Eastern Conference champions. On April 1, 2023, the Lightning clinched a playoff spot after a win over the New York Islanders. However, their three-year run to the Stanley Cup Final would come to an unfortunate end when they were eliminated by the Toronto Maple Leafs in six games in the first round of the 2023 Stanley Cup playoffs.

== Off-season ==
=== June ===
The Lightning's off-season began after losing to the Colorado Avalanche in game six of the 2022 Stanley Cup Final. Despite their playoff shortcomings, the 2021-22 Tampa Bay Lightning became the first NHL team in the post-salary cap era and the first NHL team in nearly four decades to clinch three consecutive Stanley Cup Final appearances, a feat not achieved since the 1983-1985 Edmonton Oilers.

On June 30, 2022, the Lightning announced that Darren Raddysh had been re-signed to a 2-year contract extension. Raddysh made his NHL debut last season with the Lightning, and appeared in four games.

That same day it was announced that assistant coach Derek Lalonde was hired by the Detroit Red Wings to be their new head coach. Lalonde had served as an assistant to Jon Cooper since 2018, and was a member of the 2020 and 2021 championships.

=== July ===
On July 1, 2022, the Lightning announced the re-signing of Nick Paul to a 7-year contract extension valued at $22.05 million. Paul was acquired by the Lightning from the Ottawa Senators prior to the NHL trade deadline. Paul appeared in 23 post season games on their trip to the Stanley Cup Finals, recording five goals and four assists.

That same day the Lightning placed goalie prospect Amir Miftakhov on unconditional waivers or the purpose of a buyout. Miftakhov was drafted in the sixth-round of the 2020 NHL entry draft. Miftakhov spent time with the Orlando Solar Bears of the ECHL and the Syracuse Crunch of the American Hockey League. Miftakhov has two years remaining on his entry-level contract. Miftakhov cleared waivers the following day.

On July 3, 2022, the Lightning traded defenseman Ryan McDonagh to the Nashville Predators in exchange for defenseman Philippe Myers and forward Grant Mismash. McDonagh spent the past five seasons with the lightning after coming over in a trade from the New York Rangers. McDonagh appeared in 267 regular season games with the Lightning, recording 20 goals and 99 points. McDonagh ranks third all time amongst Lightning defensemen in the playoffs in games (89), assists (21) and points (23). McDonagh also helped the team capture two Stanley Cup Championships and appear in three consecutive finals. The main purpose of the trade for the Lightning was to help obtain salary cap relief both the upcoming season and going forward. After the trade the Lightning had 6.75m in cap that they can use to try and re-sign players or use in free agency.

On July 7, 2022, the Lightning selected forward Isaac Howard from the U.S. National Development Program with the 31st pick in the 2022 NHL entry draft. This was the Lightning's first time selecting in the first-round since 2019. Howard recorded 82 points in 60 games this past season. Howard is committed to play colligate hockey for the University of Minnesota Duluth.

The following day the Lightning selected forwards Lucas Edmonds, Connor Kurth, Klavs Veinbergs, goaltender Nick Malik and defenseman Dyllan Gill.

On July 11, 2022, the Lightning re-signed goaltender Maxime Lagace to a 1-year contract extension. Lagace played in two games with the Lightning this past season, going 1–1–0. Lagace spent most of the season with the Syracuse Crunch, posting a 23–9–2 record.

The same day the Lightning declined to issue qualifying offers to Tye Felhaber, Otto Somppi, Odeen Tufto, Alex Green and Alexei Melnichuk. All of these players became unrestricted free agents on July 13, 2022.

On July 12, 2022, the Lightning announced the signing of Jeff Blashill as an assistant coach. Blashill had served as the head coach of the Detroit Red Wings over the past seven seasons.

Free Agency

July 13, 2022, was the first day of NHL free agency. The Lightning were involved in the following signings and player departures:

Forward Felix Robert was signed to a 2-year entry-level contract. Robert spent the past two seasons with the Wilkes-Barre/Scranton Penguins of the AHL. Roberts has skated in 90 games, recording 22 goals and 47 points. Roberts originally signed with the Pittsburgh Penguins as an undrafted free agent from the Sherbrooke Phoenix of the Quebec Major Junior Hockey League. Roberts is expected to join the Lightning's AHL affiliate in Syracuse.

Defenseman Ian Cole was signed to a 1-year deal, valued at $3 million. Cole skated in 75 games with the Carolina Hurricanes this past season, recording two goals and 17 assists. Cole has appeared in 670 games over his 12 seasons NHL career. He was also a member of the Penguins' back to back championship teams in 2016 and 2017.

Forward Vladislav Namestnikov was signed to a 1-year contract, valued at $2.5 million. Namestnikov appeared in 75 games this past season between the Detroit Red Wings and Dallas Stars. He recorded 16 goals and 30 points over that stretch. Namestnikov was originally drafted by the Lightning in the first round of 2011 NHL entry draft. Namestnikov also made his NHL debut with the club during the 2013–14 season. Namestnikov was eventually part of the trade package that brought over Ryan McDonagh and J. T. Miller from the New York Rangers.

Defenseman Haydn Fleury was signed to a 2-year contract that carries an annual cap hit of 762k. Fleury skated in 36 games this past season with the Seattle Kraken, recording two goals and four points. Fleury has appeared in 215 career NHL games between Seattle, Anaheim Ducks and Carolina Hurricanes. Fleury was part of Seattle's inaugural season after being claimed in the 2021 NHL expansion draft. Fleury was available to the Lightning after not receiving a qualifying offer from Seattle.

The Lightning lost the following players in initial period free agency:

Forward Charles Hudon signed a on-year contract with the Colorado Avalanche. Hudon appeared in 66 games with the Syracuse Crunch last season, recording 30 goals, 27 assists and 57 points. Hudon did not appear in any games with the Lightning last season.

Forward Anthony Richard signed a 1-year contract with the Montreal Canadiens. Richard played 71 games in the AHL last season, between the Milwaukee Admirals and Syracuse Crunch.

Defenseman Jan Rutta signed a 3-year contract with the Pittsburgh Penguins. The contract is worth $8.25 million, and carries an annual cap hit of $2.75 million. Rutta played for the Lightning over the past four seasons, and helped the team win two Stanley Cup championships.

Forward Ondrej Palat signed a 5-year contract with the New Jersey Devils. The contract carries an annual cap hit of $6 million. Palat had spent his entire 10-year NHL career with the Lightning. Palat finished his career with the Lightning with 143 goals, 280 assists and 423 points. Palat also helped the Lightning to capture two Stanley Cup championships and appear in four Stanley Cup Finals.

Re-signings

On the first day of free agency the Lightning re-signed the following players:

Defenseman Mikhail Sergachev was signed to an 8-year contract extension valued at $68 million. Sergachev was former 9th overall pick that came over via trade for Jonathan Drouin from the Montreal Canadiens prior to the 2017–18 season. Sergachev saw his role gradually increase to the Lightning during the team's run to two Stanley Cups, and is expected to take on a regular top-4 role.

Forward Anthony Cirelli was signed to an 8-year contract extension valued at $50 million. Cirelli came to the Lightning via a third round pick in the 2015 NHL entry draft. Cirelli has developed into a two-way, second line center. In that capacity Cirelli is often tasked in a shutdown role, which regularly sees him matched up against other team's top line. Cirelli has appeared in 294 games, recording 66 goals and 159 points. He has also put up 14 goals and 34 points in 92 playoff games, which also included winning two Stanley Cups with the team.

Defenseman Erik Cernak was signed to an 8-year contract extension valued at $41.6 million. Cernak was originally drafted by the Los Angeles Kings in the 2015 NHL Entry Draft and was subsequently traded to the Lightning in the trade for goaltender Ben Bishop. Cernak spent one season in the minors before graduating to the Lightning roster during the 2018–19 season. Cernak became a defensive minded top-4 defenseman for the team. Cernak has appeared in 226 NHL games, recording 16 goals and 59 points. In the playoffs Cernak has two goals and 19 points over 73 playoff games. Cernak was also a member of the back-to-back Stanley Cup championships.

Post Free Agency Frenzy

On July 22, 2022, the Lightning signed forward Lucas Edmonds to a three-year entry-level contract. Edmonds joined the organization via the 2022 NHL entry draft in the third-round. Edmonds played most of his juniors career in Sweden before moving to the Ontario Hockey League with the Kingston Frontenacs this past season. He recorded 34 goals, 79 assists and 113 points in 68 games with the Frontenacs.

On July 25, 2022, the Lightning signed defensemen Trevor Carrick to a 1-year contract. Carrick was with the San Diego Gulls of the AHL this past season. Carrick appeared in 61 games, recording 10 goals, 20 assists and 30 points.

=== August ===
On August 17, 2022, former Lightning prospect Cole Guttman signed as a free agent out of college with the Chicago Blackhawks. Guttman was originally drafted in the 6th-round by the Lightning in the 2017 NHL entry draft. Guttman became a free agent after not signing with the Lightning after the August 15th deadline this year. Guttman played last season with the University of Denver. Guttman captained the team to the 2022 NCAA Hockey Championship.

On August 18, 2022, former Lightning prospect Sammy Walker signed as a free agent out of college with the Minnesota Wild. Walker was originally a 7th-round draft pick by the Lightning in the 2017 NHL Entry Draft. Walker was a made a free agent after not signing with the Lightning after the August 15th deadline this year. Walker spent the previous four years at the University of Minnesota.

=== September ===
On September 13, 2022, the Lightning announced its 30th anniversary celebration for the season. As part of this announcement the team will create a Lightning Hockey Hall of Fame. The first class will be inducted during a home game in the spring. The exact date and members to be inducted is to be determined at a later date.

== Training camp ==
=== September ===
On September 19, 2022, the Lightning announced its training camp roster for the coming season. The roster is made up of 29 forwards, 21 defensemen and six goaltenders.

Forward Group Alex Barre-Boulet, Pierre-Edouard Bellemare, Maxim Cajkovic, Anthony Cirelli, Ross Colton, Gabriel Dumont, Jaydon Dureau, Lucas Edmonds, Shawn Element, Jack Finley, Gabriel Fortier, Gage Goncalves, Brandon Hagel, Alex Killorn, Cole Koepke, Nikita Kucherov, Pierre-Cedric Labrie, Bennett MacArthur, Patrick Maroon, Grant Mismash, Vladislav Namestnikov, Nick Paul, Corey Perry, Brayden Point, Felix Robert, Simon Ryfors, Gemel Smith, Steven Stamkos and Ilya Usau.

Defensemen Group Zach Bogosian, Declan Carlile, Trevor Carrick, Erik Cernak, Ian Cole, Sean Day, Tyson Feist, Haydn Fleury, Cal Foote, Dyllan Gill, Victor Hedman, Ryan Jones, Cameron MacDonald, Philippe Myers, Nick Perbix, Darren Raddysh, Roman Schmidt, Dmitry Semykin, Mikhail Sergachev, Jack Thompson and Daniel Walcott.

Goalie Group Hugo Alnefelt, Brad Barone, Brian Elliott, Jack LaFontaine, Maxime Lagace and Andrei Vasilevskiy.

Roster Reductions On September 28, 2022, the Lightning returned prospect Roman Schmidt to the Kitchener Rangers of the Ontario Hockey League. The move reduced the Lightning's camp roster to 55 players.

=== October ===
On October 1, 2022, the Lightning announced that it had reduced its training camp roster down to 38 players. The following players were assigned to the Syracuse Crunch: Hugo Alnefelt, Declan Carlile, Trevor Carrick, Jaydon Dureau, Lucas Edmonds, Jack Finley, Gage Goncalves, Maxime Lagace, Bennett MacArthur, Grant Mismash, Darren Raddysh, Felix Robert, Simon Ryfors, Dmitry Semykin, Jack Thompson, Ilya Usau and Daniel Walcott.

On October 2, 2022, the Lightning further reduced their roster by 9 players. The following players were assigned to the Syracuse Crunch: Maxim Cajkovic, Gabriel Dumont, Shawn Element, Tyson Feist, Ryan Jones and Jack LaFontaine. Additionally, Dyllan Gill and Cameron MacDonald were returned to their junior teams and Brad Barone was released from his camp tryout.

On October 4, 2022, the Lightning reduced its roster by 3 players. Alex Barré-Boulet, Gemel Smith and Sean Day were the players assigned to the Syracuse Crunch. The move brought the Lightning's roster count down to 26 players.

On October 7, 2022, the Lightning reduced its roster down to 24 players. Defensive prospect Nick Perbix was assigned to the Syracuse Crunch and forward Pierre-Cédric Labrie was released from his camp tryout agreement. Labrie will also be joining the Crunch as he is still under contract with that team on a AHL only contract.

On October 9, 2022, the Lightning signed forward Pierre-Cedric Labrie to a 1-year contract. Labrie spent the previous season between the Hartford Wolf Pack and the Syracuse Crunch. This signing replaces Labrie's AHL only contract with the team.

That evening the Lightning suspended defensemen Ian Cole pending an investigation into allegations involving the sexual abuse of a woman when she was a minor. The allegations came to light via a social media post.

On October 11, 2022, the Lightning's season opening roster was finalized. The forward group is made up of Pierre-Edouard Bellemare, Ross Colton, Gabriel Fortier, Brandon Hagel, Cole Koepke, Alex Killorn, Nikita Kucherov, Nick Paul, Corey Perry, Patrick Maroon, Vladislav Namestnikov, Brayden Point and Steven Stamkos. The defense consists of Erik Cernak, Ian Cole, Haydn Fleury, Cal Foote, Victor Hedman, Philippe Myers and Mikhail Sergachev. The goalie tandem of Andrei Vasilevskiy and Brian Elliott rounds out the roster.

== Standings ==
=== Divisional standings ===
Atlantic Division
Pos	Team	GP	W	L	OTL	RW	GF	GA	GD	Pts
1	p – Boston Bruins	82	65	12	5	54	305	177	+128	135
2	x – Toronto Maple Leafs	82	50	21	11	42	279	222	+57	111
3	x – Tampa Bay Lightning	82	46	30	6	38	283	254	+29	98
4	x – Florida Panthers	82	42	32	8	36	290	273	+17	92
5	Buffalo Sabres	82	42	33	7	30	296	300	−4	91
6	Ottawa Senators	82	39	35	8	31	261	271	−10	86
7	Detroit Red Wings	82	35	37	10	28	240	279	−39	80
8	Montreal Canadiens	82	31	45	6	21	232	307	−75	68

Source: National Hockey League
Rules for classification: 1) Fewer number of games played (GP, only during regular season); 2) Greater number of regulation wins (RW); 3) Greater number of wins in regulation and overtime, excluding shootout wins (ROW); 4) Greater number of total wins, including shootouts (W); 5) Greater number of points earned in head-to-head play; if teams played an uneven number of head-to-head games, the result of the first game on the home ice of the team with the extra home game is discarded; 6) Greater goal differential (GD); 7) Greater number of goals scored (GF)
p – Clinched Presidents' Trophy; x – Clinched playoff spot

=== Conference standings ===
Eastern Conference Wild Card
Pos	Div	Team	GP	W	L	OTL	RW	GF	GA	GD	Pts
1	ME	x – New York Islanders	82	42	31	9	36	243	222	+21	93
2	AT	x – Florida Panthers	82	42	32	8	36	290	273	+17	92
3	ME	Pittsburgh Penguins	82	40	31	11	31	262	264	−2	91
4	AT	Buffalo Sabres	82	42	33	7	30	296	300	−4	91
5	AT	Ottawa Senators	82	39	35	8	31	261	271	−10	86
6	AT	Detroit Red Wings	82	35	37	10	28	240	279	−39	80
7	ME	Washington Capitals	82	35	37	10	27	255	265	−10	80
8	ME	Philadelphia Flyers	82	31	38	13	26	222	277	−55	75
9	AT	Montreal Canadiens	82	31	45	6	21	232	307	−75	68
10	ME	Columbus Blue Jackets	82	25	48	9	15	214	330	−116	59

Source: National Hockey League
Rules for classification: 1) Fewer number of games played (GP, only during regular season); 2) Greater number of regulation wins (RW); 3) Greater number of wins in regulation and overtime, excluding shootout wins (ROW); 4) Greater number of total wins, including shootouts (W); 5) Greater number of points earned in head-to-head play; if teams played an uneven number of head-to-head games, the result of the first game on the home ice of the team with the extra home game is discarded; 6) Greater goal differential (GD); 7) Greater number of goals scored (GF)
x – Clinched playoff spot

== Schedule and results ==
=== Preseason ===
2022 preseason game log: 1–4–0 (Home: 1–1–0; Road: 0–3–0)

Game	Date	Opponent	Score	OT	Decision	Location	Attendance	Record	Recap
1	September 27	@ Carolina Hurricanes	1–5		Lagace	PNC Arena	10,083	0–1–0	
—	September 28	Carolina Hurricanes	Game cancelled due to the impending threat from Hurricane Ian.						
—	September 29	Nashville Predators	Game moved to Nashville due to the impending threat from Hurricane Ian.						
2	September 29	vs. Nashville Predators	0–2		Elliott	Bridgestone Arena	7,492	0–2–0	
3	September 30	@ Nashville Predators	1–7		Alnefelt	Bridgestone Arena	15,884	0–3–0	
4	October 6	@ Florida Panthers	2–3		Vasilevskiy	FLA Live Arena	11,350	0–4–0	
5	October 8	Florida Panthers	5–2		Vasilevskiy	Amalie Arena	19,092	1–4–0	

Lightning score listed first;

Win Loss Overtime/shootout loss Cancellation

=== Regular season ===
2022–23 Regular season game log
October: 5–4–0, 10 points (Home: 1–1–0; Road: 4–3–0)

Game	Date	Opponent	Score	OT	Decision	Location	Attendance	Record	Points	Recap
1	October 11	@ New York Rangers	1–3		Vasilevskiy	Madison Square Garden	18,006	0–1–0	0	
2	October 14	@ Columbus Blue Jackets	5–2		Vasilevskiy	Nationwide Arena	18,889	1–1–0	2	
3	October 15	@ Pittsburgh Penguins	2–6		Elliott	PPG Paints Arena	18,416	1–2–0	2	
4	October 18	Philadelphia Flyers	2–3		Vasilevskiy	Amalie Arena	19,092	1–3–0	2	
5	October 21	@ Florida Panthers	3–2	OT	Vasilevskiy	FLA Live Arena	17,531	2–3–0	4	
6	October 22	New York Islanders	5–3		Elliott	Amalie Arena	19,092	3–3–0	6	
7	October 25	@ Los Angeles Kings	2–4		Vasilevskiy	Crypto.com Arena	16,480	3–4–0	6	
8	October 26	@ Anaheim Ducks	4–2		Elliott	Honda Center	14,889	4–4–0	8	
9	October 29	@ San Jose Sharks	4–3		Vasilevskiy	SAP Center	15,122	5–4–0	10	

November: 8–3–1, 17 points (Home: 6–2–1; Road: 2–2–0)

Game	Date	Opponent	Score	OT	Decision	Location	Attendance	Record	Points	Recap
10	November 1	Ottawa Senators	4–3		Vasilevskiy	Amalie Arena	19,092	6–4–0	12	
11	November 3	Carolina Hurricanes	3–4	SO	Vasilevskiy	Amalie Arena	19,092	6–4–1	13	
12	November 5	Buffalo Sabres	5–3		Elliott	Amalie Arena	19,092	7–4–1	15	
13	November 8	Edmonton Oilers	2–3		Vasilevskiy	Amalie Arena	19,092	7–5–1	15	
14	November 11	@ Washington Capitals	1–5		Vasilevskiy	Capital One Arena	18,573	7–6–1	15	
15	November 13	Washington Capitals	6–3		Vasilevskiy	Amalie Arena	19,092	8–6–1	17	
16	November 15	Dallas Stars	5–4	OT	Elliott	Amalie Arena	19,092	9–6–1	19	
17	November 17	Calgary Flames	4–1		Vasilevskiy	Amalie Arena	19,092	10–6–1	21	
18	November 19	@ Nashville Predators	3–2	OT	Vasilevskiy	Bridgestone Arena	17,444	11–6–1	23	
19	November 21	Boston Bruins	3–5		Vasilevskiy	Amalie Arena	19,092	11–7–1	23	
20	November 25	St. Louis Blues	5–2		Vasilevskiy	Amalie Arena	19,092	12–7–1	25	
21	November 28	@ Buffalo Sabres	6–5	OT	Elliott	KeyBank Center	11,766	13–7–1	27	
22	November 29	@ Boston Bruins	1–3		Vasilevskiy	TD Garden	17,850	13–8–1	27	

December: 10–3–0, 20 points (Home: 8–1–0; Road: 2–2–0)

Game	Date	Opponent	Score	OT	Decision	Location	Attendance	Record	Points	Recap
23	December 1	@ Philadelphia Flyers	4–1		Vasilevskiy	Wells Fargo Center	17,867	14–8–1	29	
24	December 3	Toronto Maple Leafs	4–3	OT	Vasilevskiy	Amalie Arena	19,092	15–8–1	31	
25	December 6	Detroit Red Wings	2–4		Vasilevskiy	Amalie Arena	19,092	15–9–1	31	
26	December 8	Nashville Predators	5–2		Elliott	Amalie Arena	19,092	16–9–1	33	
27	December 10	Florida Panthers	4–1		Vasilevskiy	Amalie Arena	19,092	17–9–1	35	
28	December 13	Seattle Kraken	6–2		Vasilevskiy	Amalie Arena	19,092	18–9–1	37	
29	December 15	Columbus Blue Jackets	4–1		Elliott	Amalie Arena	19,092	19–9–1	39	
30	December 17	@ Montreal Canadiens	5–1		Vasilevskiy	Bell Centre	21,105	20–9–1	41	
31	December 20	@ Toronto Maple Leafs	1–4		Vasilevskiy	Scotiabank Arena	18,962	20–10–1	41	
32	December 21	@ Detroit Red Wings	4–7		Elliott	Little Caesars Arena	19,515	20–11–1	41	
—	December 23	@ Buffalo Sabres	Postponed due to winter storm. Moved to March 4.							
33	December 28	Montreal Canadiens	4–1		Vasilevskiy	Amalie Arena	19,092	21–11–1	43	
34	December 29	New York Rangers	2–1	SO	Vasilevskiy	Amalie Arena	19,092	22–11–1	45	
35	December 31	Arizona Coyotes	5–3		Vasilevskiy	Amalie Arena	19,092	23–11–1	47	

January: 9–4–0, 18 points (Home: 5–0–0; Road: 4–4–0)

Game	Date	Opponent	Score	OT	Decision	Location	Attendance	Record	Points	Recap
36	January 3	@ Chicago Blackhawks	4–1		Elliott	United Center	18,429	24–11–1	49	
37	January 4	@ Minnesota Wild	1–5		Elliott	Xcel Energy Center	18,427	24–12–1	49	
38	January 6	@ Winnipeg Jets	2–4		Vasilevskiy	Canada Life Centre	15,325	24–13–1	49	
39	January 10	Columbus Blue Jackets	6–3		Vasilevskiy	Amalie Arena	19,092	25–13–1	51	
40	January 12	Vancouver Canucks	5–4		Vasilevskiy	Amalie Arena	19,092	26–13–1	53	
41	January 14	@ St. Louis Blues	4–2		Vasilevskiy	Enterprise Center	18,096	27–13–1	55	
42	January 16	@ Seattle Kraken	4–1		Vasilevskiy	Climate Pledge Arena	17,151	28–13–1	57	
43	January 18	@ Vancouver Canucks	5–2		Elliott	Rogers Arena	18,792	29–13–1	59	
44	January 19	@ Edmonton Oilers	3–5		Vasilevskiy	Rogers Place	17,742	29–14–1	59	
45	January 21	@ Calgary Flames	3–6		Vasilevskiy	Scotiabank Saddledome	18,831	29–15–1	59	
46	January 24	Minnesota Wild	4–2		Vasilevskiy	Amalie Arena	19,092	30–15–1	61	
47	January 26	Boston Bruins	3–2		Vasilevskiy	Amalie Arena	19,092	31–15–1	63	
48	January 28	Los Angeles Kings	5–2		Vasilevskiy	Amalie Arena	19,092	32–15–1	65	

February: 5–3–3, 13 points (Home: 2–0–2; Road: 3–3–1)

Game	Date	Opponent	Score	OT	Decision	Location	Attendance	Record	Points	Recap
All-Star Break (February 2–5)
49	February 6	@ Florida Panthers	1–7		Vasilevskiy	FLA Live Arena	15,882	32–16–1	65	
50	February 7	San Jose Sharks	3–4	OT	Elliott	Amalie Arena	19,092	32–16–2	66	
51	February 9	Colorado Avalanche	5–0		Vasilevskiy	Amalie Arena	19,092	33–16–2	68	
52	February 11	@ Dallas Stars	3–1		Vasilevskiy	American Airlines Center	18,532	34–16–2	70	
53	February 14	@ Colorado Avalanche	4–3	SO	Vasilevskiy	Ball Arena	18,072	35–16–2	72	
54	February 15	@ Arizona Coyotes	0–1	SO	Elliott	Mullett Arena	4,600	35–16–3	73	
55	February 18	@ Vegas Golden Knights	4–5		Vasilevskiy	T-Mobile Arena	18,317	35–17–3	73	
56	February 21	Anaheim Ducks	6–1		Vasilevskiy	Amalie Arena	19,092	36–17–3	75	
57	February 23	Buffalo Sabres	5–6	OT	Vasilevskiy	Amalie Arena	19,092	36–17–4	76	
58	February 25	@ Detroit Red Wings	3–0		Vasilevskiy	Little Caesars Arena	19,515	37–17–4	78	
59	February 26	@ Pittsburgh Penguins	3–7		Elliott	PPG Paints Arena	17,691	37–18–4	78	
60	February 28	Florida Panthers	1–4		Vasilevskiy	Amalie Arena	19,092	37–19–4	78	

March: 7–7–2, 16 points (Home: 4–2–2; Road: 3–4–0)

Game	Date	Opponent	Score	OT	Decision	Location	Attendance	Record	Points	Recap
61	March 2	Pittsburgh Penguins	4–5	OT	Vasilevskiy	Amalie Arena	19,092	37–19–5	79	
62	March 4	@ Buffalo Sabres	3–5		Elliott	KeyBank Center	19,070	37–20–5	79	
63	March 5	@ Carolina Hurricanes	0–6		Vasilevskiy	PNC Arena	18,965	37–21–5	79	
64	March 7	Philadelphia Flyers	5–2		Vasilevskiy	Amalie Arena	19,092	38–21–5	81	
65	March 9	Vegas Golden Knights	3–4	OT	Vasilevskiy	Amalie Arena	19,092	38–21–6	82	
66	March 11	Chicago Blackhawks	3–1		Elliott	Amalie Arena	19,092	39–21–6	84	
67	March 12	Winnipeg Jets	2–3		Vasilevskiy	Amalie Arena	19,092	39–22–6	84	
68	March 14	@ New Jersey Devils	4–1		Vasilevskiy	Prudential Center	15,622	40–22–6	86	
69	March 16	@ New Jersey Devils	4–3	SO	Vasilevskiy	Prudential Center	16,094	41–22–6	88	
70	March 18	Montreal Canadiens	5–3		Elliott	Amalie Arena	19,092	42–22–6	90	
71	March 19	New Jersey Devils	2–5		Vasilevskiy	Amalie Arena	19,092	42–23–6	90	
72	March 21	@ Montreal Canadiens	2–3		Vasilevskiy	Bell Centre	21,105	42–24–6	90	
73	March 23	@ Ottawa Senators	2–7		Elliott	Canadian Tire Centre	16,133	42–25–6	90	
74	March 25	@ Boston Bruins	1–2		Vasilevskiy	TD Garden	17,850	42–26–6	90	
75	March 28	@ Carolina Hurricanes	4–0		Vasilevskiy	PNC Arena	18,680	43–26–6	92	
76	March 30	Washington Capitals	5–1		Vasilevskiy	Amalie Arena	19,092	44–26–6	94	

April: 2–4–0, 4 points (Home: 2–1–0; Road: 0–3–0)

Game	Date	Opponent	Score	OT	Decision	Location	Attendance	Record	Points	Recap
77	April 1	New York Islanders	5–0		Vasilevskiy	Amalie Arena	19,092	45–26–6	96	
78	April 5	@ New York Rangers	3–6		Vasilevskiy	Madison Square Garden	18,006	45–27–6	96	
79	April 6	@ New York Islanders	1–6		Elliott	UBS Arena	17,255	45–28–6	96	
80	April 8	@ Ottawa Senators	4–7		Elliott	Canadian Tire Centre	19,044	45–29–6	96	
81	April 11	Toronto Maple Leafs	3–4		Vasilevskiy	Amalie Arena	19,092	45–30–6	96	
82	April 13	Detroit Red Wings	5–0		Elliott	Amalie Arena	19,092	46–30–6	98	

Lightning score listed first;

Win (2 points) Loss (0 points) Overtime/shootout loss (1 point)

=== Playoffs ===
2023 Stanley Cup playoffs
Eastern Conference First Round vs. Toronto Maple Leafs (A2) - Toronto wins series 4–2

Game	Date	Opponent	Score	OT	Decision	Location	Attendance	Series	Recap
1	April 18	@ Toronto Maple Leafs	7–3		Vasilevskiy	Scotiabank Arena	19,013	1–0	
2	April 20	@ Toronto Maple Leafs	2–7		Vasilevskiy	Scotiabank Arena	19,128	1–1	
3	April 22	Toronto Maple Leafs	3–4	OT	Vasilevskiy	Amalie Arena	19,092	1–2	
4	April 24	Toronto Maple Leafs	4–5	OT	Vasilevskiy	Amalie Arena	19,092	1–3	
5	April 27	@ Toronto Maple Leafs	4–2		Vasilevskiy	Scotiabank Arena	19,663	2–3	
6	April 29	Toronto Maple Leafs	1–2	OT	Vasilevskiy	Amalie Arena	19,092	2–4	

Lightning score listed first;

Win Loss If necessary

== Player stats ==
Final

=== Skaters ===
Regular season
Player	GP	G	A	Pts	+/−	PIM
Nikita Kucherov	82	30	83	113	−2	36
Brayden Point	82	51	44	95	2	7
Steven Stamkos	81	34	50	84	−5	46
Brandon Hagel	81	30	34	64	23	54
Alex Killorn	82	27	37	64	18	45
Mikhail Sergachev	79	10	54	64	13	53
Victor Hedman	76	9	40	49	10	42
Nick Paul	80	17	15	32	11	33
Ross Colton	81	16	16	32	−8	50
Anthony Cirelli	58	11	18	29	13	33
Corey Perry	81	12	13	25	−28	95
Nick Perbix	69	5	15	20	11	22
Ian Cole	78	3	14	17	13	61
Erik Cernak	70	2	14	16	8	53
Vladislav Namestnikov^{‡}	57	6	9	15	−2	19
Patrick Maroon	80	5	9	14	−5	150
Pierre-Edouard Bellemare	73	4	9	13	−9	34
Zach Bogosian	46	1	4	5	−4	42
Tanner Jeannot^{†}	20	1	3	4	−6	22
Cal Foote^{‡}	26	1	2	3	3	28
Darren Raddysh	17	1	2	3	−4	4
Philippe Myers	11	1	2	3	0	4
Michael Eyssimont^{†}	15	1	1	2	−3	22
Cole Koepke	17	1	0	1	−5	2
Balcers Rudolfs^{†}	3	1	0	1	1	0
Haydn Fleury	29	0	1	1	−10	14
Gabriel Fortier	1	0	0	0	0	0
Alex Barre-Boulet	1	0	0	0	0	0

Playoffs
Player	GP	G	A	Pts	+/−	PIM
Anthony Cirelli	6	3	3	6	1	4
Nikita Kucherov	6	1	5	6	0	11
Alex Killorn	6	3	2	5	0	0
Corey Perry	6	2	3	5	1	7
Brandon Hagel	6	1	4	5	0	0
Steven Stamkos	6	2	2	4	−2	9
Brayden Point	6	2	2	4	−2	2
Ross Colton	6	1	3	4	0	4
Ian Cole	6	1	2	3	−2	4
Mikhail Sergachev	6	1	2	3	−4	16
Nick Perbix	5	0	3	3	1	0
Victor Hedman	5	0	3	3	4	2
Pierre-Edouard Bellemare	6	1	1	2	0	0
Darren Raddysh	6	1	1	2	−3	2
Michael Eyssimont	3	1	1	2	1	0
Nick Paul	6	1	0	1	−1	2
Patrick Maroon	6	0	1	1	1	16
Zach Bogosian	5	0	1	1	2	7
Tanner Jeannot	3	0	0	0	−2	5
Haydn Fleury	1	0	0	0	0	0
Erik Cernak	1	0	0	0	0	2

=== Goaltenders ===
Regular season
Player	GP	GS	TOI	W	L	OT	GA	GAA	SA	SV%	SO	G	A	PIM
Andrei Vasilevskiy	60	60	3597	34	22	4	159	2.65	1875	.915	4	0	2	0
Brian Elliott	22	22	1325	12	8	2	75	3.40	689	.891	2	0	1	0

Playoffs
Player	GP	GS	TOI	W	L	GA	GAA	SA	SV%	SO	G	A	PIM
Andrei Vasilevskiy	6	6	388	2	4	23	3.56	184	.875	0	0	0	0

^{†}Denotes player spent time with another team before joining Tampa Bay. Stats reflect time with Tampa Bay only.
^{‡}Traded from Tampa Bay mid-season.
Bold/italics denotes franchise record

== Suspensions/fines ==
Player	Explanation	Length	Salary	Date issued
Patrick Maroon	Fined for Unsportsmanlike Conduct during the game against the Washington Capitals on November 11, 2022, at Capital One Arena.	—	$2,702.70	November 11, 2022
Mikhail Sergachev	Fined for slashing Michael Bunting during the game against the Toronto Maple Leafs on December 20, 2022, at Scotiabank Arena.	—	$5,000	December 21, 2022
Mikhail Sergachev	Fined for roughing Conor Garland during the game against the Vancouver Canucks on January 12, 2023, at Amalie Arena.	—	$5,000	January 13, 2023
Ian Cole	Fined for kneeing Andrew Cogliano during the game against the Colorado Avalanche on February 9, 2023, at Amalie Arena.	—	$5,000	February 10, 2023
Erik Cernak	Suspended for elbowing Kyle Okposo during the game against the Buffalo Sabres on February 23, 2023, at Amalie Arena.	2 games	$31,892	February 24, 2023
Alex Killorn	Fined for slashing Igor Shesterkin during the game against the New York Rangers on April 5, 2023, at Madison Square Garden.	—	$5,000	April 6, 2023

== Awards and honours ==
=== Awards ===
Regular season
Player	Award	Awarded
Nikita Kucherov	2023 National Hockey League All-Star Game	January 5, 2023
Nikita Kucherov	NHL Third Star of the Week	January 16, 2023
Andrei Vasilevskiy	2023 National Hockey League All-Star Game	January 19, 2023
Steven Stamkos	NHL Second Star of the Week	January 23, 2023
Andrei Vasilevskiy	NHL Third Star of the Week	January 30, 2023
Andrei Vasilevskiy	NHL First Star of the Week	April 3, 20223
Steven Stamkos	2023 Mark Messier Leadership Award	June 26, 2023

=== Milestones ===
Regular season
Player	Milestone	Reached
Cole Koepke	1st career NHL game	October 11, 2022
Victor Hedman	900th career NHL game	October 14, 2022
Nick Perbix	1st career NHL game	October 18, 2022
Nick Perbix	1st career NHL point 1st career NHL assist	October 26, 2022
Cal Foote	100th career NHL game	November 3, 2022
Nick Perbix	1st career NHL goal	November 5, 2022
Pierre-Edouard Bellemare	600th career NHL game	November 8, 2022
Cole Koepke	1st career NHL goal 1st career NHL point	November 13, 2022
Steven Stamkos	500th career NHL assist	November 15, 2022
Steven Stamkos	1000th career NHL point	December 1, 2022
Corey Perry	1200th career NHL game	December 5, 2022
Nick Paul	100th career NHL point	December 10, 2022
Nikita Kucherov	400th career NHL assist	December 13, 2022
Mikhail Sergachev	200th career NHL point	December 13, 2022
Anthony Cirelli	300th career NHL game	December 15, 2022
Brayden Point	400th career NHL point	December 22, 2022
Ian Cole	700th career NHL game	December 28, 2022
Nikita Kucherov	600th career NHL game	January 6, 2023
Brandon Hagel	100th career NHL point	January 10, 2023
Steven Stamkos	500th career NHL goal 11th career NHL Hattrick	January 18, 2023
Andrei Vasilevskiy	250th career NHL win	January 24, 2023
Andrei Vasilevskiy	400th career NHL game	January 27, 2023
Vladislav Namestnikov	600th career NHL game	February 6, 2023
Patrick Maroon	700th career NHL game	February 9, 2023
Victor Hedman	500th career NHL assist	February 11, 2023
Brayden Point	200th career NHL goal	February 21, 2023
Andrei Vasilevskiy	30th career NHL shutout	February 25, 2023
Nikita Kucherov	700th career NHL point	February 26, 2023
Brandon Hagel	200th career NHL game 2nd career NHL Hattrick	March 18, 2023
Alex Killorn	800th career NHL game	April 1, 2023
Darren Raddysh	1st career NHL point 1st career NHL assist	April 1, 2023
Darren Raddysh	1st career NHL goal	April 5, 2023
Steven Stamkos	1000th career NHL game	April 6, 2023
Brian Elliott	45th career NHL shutout	April 13, 2023

Playoffs
Player	Milestone	Reached
Nick Perbix	1st career playoff game 1st career playoff assist 1st career playoff point	April 18, 2023
Darren Raddysh	1st career playoff game	April 18, 2023
Michael Eyssimont	1st career playoff game	April 18, 2023
Darren Raddysh	1st career playoff goal 1st career playoff point	April 22, 2023
Michael Eyssimont	1st career playoff goal 1st career playoff assist 1st career playoff point	April 27, 2023
Darren Raddysh	1st career playoff assist	April 29, 2023

=== Records ===
Regular season
Player	Record	Reached
Steven Stamkos	Most seasons played by a Tampa Bay Lightning player in franchise history. Stamkos moved past Vincent Lecavalier (14).	October 11, 2022
Victor Hedman	Tied for second most seasons played by a Tampa Bay Lightning player in franchise history. Hedman tied Vincent Lecavalier (14).	October 11, 2022
Victor Hedman	Fourth player in Tampa Bay Lightning history to play 900 career games with it.	October 14, 2022
Steven Stamkos	Second most assists in Tampa Bay Lightning history, which passed Vincent Lecavalier (491).	October 15, 2022
Brayden Point	Ninth most points in Tampa Bay Lightning history, which passed Vaclav Prospal (371).	October 21, 2022
Mikhail Sergachev	Most points in a single period by a defenseman in Tampa Bay Lightning history and tied most in NHL history (4).	November 14, 2022
Steven Stamkos	Second player in Tampa Bay Lightning history to record 500 career assists with the team.	November 15, 2022
Steven Stamkos	First player in Tampa Bay Lightning history to record 1000 career points with the team.	December 1, 2022
Alex Killorn	Eighth most assists in Tampa Bay Lightning history, which passed Vaclav Prospal (244).	December 10, 2022
Alex Killorn	Seventh most points in Tampa Bay Lightning history, which passed Ondrej Palat (423).	December 10, 2022
Nikita Kucherov	Eighth most games played in Tampa Bay Lightning history, which passed Tyler Johnson (589)	December 13, 2022
Nikita Kucherov	Fifth Player in Tampa Bay Lightning history to record 400 career NHL assists.	December 13, 2022
Nikita Kucherov	Fastest player in Tampa Bay Lightning history to record 400 career NHL assists.	December 13, 2022
Steven Stamkos	Second longest point streak in Tampa Bay Lightning history (14 games).	December 13, 2022
Brayden Point	Most consecutive home games with a goal in Tampa Bay Lightning history. Point moved past Nikita Kucherov for the record (7 games)	December 31, 2022
Victor Hedman	Third most assists in Tampa Bay Lightning history. Hedman moved past Vincent Lecavalier (491) for the record.	January 3, 2023
Steven Stamkos	First player in Tampa Bay Lightning history to record 500 career goals with the team. Stamkos was also the twenty-third player to record all 500 goals with the same franchise.	January 18, 2023
Steven Stamkos	Eighth player in NHL History to record a hattrick during the game in which they record their 500th career goal. Stamkos is also the only player in franchise history to do so.	January 18, 2023
Steven Stamkos	Most 20 goal seasons in Tampa Bay Lightning history. This moved Stamkos past Vincent Lecavalier (12) for the record.	January 18, 2023
Brayden Point	Eighth most points in Tampa Bay Lightning history. This moved Point past Ondrej Palat for the record (423).	February 7, 2023
Victor Hedman	Third player in Tampa Bay Lightning history to record 500 career NHL assists with the team. Hedman was the first defensemen in team history to reach this milestone.	February 11, 2023
Nikita Kucherov	First player in Tampa Bay Lightning history to record three 60 assist seasons with the team. This moved him past Martin St. Louis (2) for the record.	February 24, 2023
Nikita Kucherov	Fourth player in Tampa Bay Lightning history to record 700 career points with the team.	February 26, 2023
Alex Killorn	Fifth player in Tampa Bay Lightning history to record 800 career games played with the team.	April 1, 2023
Nikita Kucherov	Third most points in a single season in Tampa Bay Lightning history. Kucherov moved past Steven Stamkos (106) this day.	April 5, 2023
Steven Stamkos	Second player in Tampa Bay Lightning history to play in 1000 career games with the team.	April 6, 2023
Nikita Kucherov	Second most points in a single season in Tampa Bay Lightning history. Kucherov moved past Vincent Lecavalier (108) this day.	April 8, 2023
Victor Hedman	Third most games played in Tampa Bay Lightning history. Hedman moved past Martin St. Louis (972) this day.	April 8, 2023
Victor Hedman	Tied for tenth most goals in Tampa Bay Lightning history. This tied Hedman with Ondrej Palat (143).	April 8, 2023
Brayden Point	Third player in Tampa Bay Lightning history to score 50 goals in a single season. Point also tied Steven Stamkos for the third most goals in a single season by a Lightning player.	April 13, 2023
Brayden Point	Ninth most assists in Tampa Bay Lighting history, which passed Vaclav Prospal (244).	April 13, 2023

== Transactions ==
The Lightning have been involved in the following transactions during the 2022–23 season.

=== Trades ===
Date	Details		Ref
July 8, 2022	To Los Angeles Kings 4th-round pick in 2022; 6th-round pick in 2022	To Tampa Bay Lightning 3rd-round pick in 2022	
February 27, 2023	To Nashville Predators Cal Foote; 1st-round pick in 2025; 2nd-round pick in 2024; 3rd-round pick in 2023; 4th-round pick in 2023; 5th-round pick in 2023	To Tampa Bay Lightning Tanner Jeannot	
March 1, 2023	To San Jose Sharks Vladislav Namestnikov	To Tampa Bay Lightning Mikey Eyssimont	

=== Free agents ===
Date	Player	Team	Contract term	Ref
July 13, 2022	Felix Robert	from Wilkes-Barre/Scranton Penguins	2-year	
July 13, 2022	Ian Cole	from Carolina Hurricanes	1-year	
July 13, 2022	Vladislav Namestnikov	from Dallas Stars	1-year	
July 13, 2022	Haydn Fleury	from Seattle Kraken	2-year	
July 13, 2022	Charles Hudon	to Colorado Avalanche	1-year	
July 13, 2022	Anthony Richard	to Montreal Canadiens	1-year	
July 13, 2022	Jan Rutta	to Pittsburgh Penguins	3-year	
July 14, 2022	Ondrej Palat	to New Jersey Devils	5-year	
July 19, 2022	Alex Green	to Laval Rocket	1-year	
July 25, 2022	Trevor Carrick	from Anaheim Ducks	1-year	
August 26, 2022	Remi Elie	to Färjestad BK	1-year	
August 31, 2022	Odeen Tufto	to Tucson Roadrunners	1-year	
September 7, 2022	Tye Felhaber	to Fort Wayne Komets	1-year	
September 15, 2022	Riley Nash	to Charlotte Checkers	2-year	
October 9, 2022	Pierre-Cedric Labrie	from Syracuse Crunch	1-year	
May 10, 2022	Matt Tomkins	from Farjestad BK	2-year	
June 5, 2023	Waltteri Merela	from Tappara	1-year	
June 5, 2023	Emil Lilleberg	from IK Oskarshamn	2-year	

=== Waivers ===
Date	Player	Team	Ref
November 12, 2022	Rudolfs Balcers	from Florida Panthers	

=== Contract terminations ===
Date	Player	Via	Ref

=== Retirement ===
Date	Player	Ref

=== Signings ===
Date	Player	Contract term	Ref
July 11, 2022	Maxime Lagace	1-year	
July 13, 2022	Mikhail Sergachev	8-year	
July 13, 2022	Anthony Cirelli	8-year	
July 13, 2022	Erik Cernak	8-year	
July 23, 2022	Lucas Edmonds	3-year	
August 26, 2022	Philippe Myers	1-year	
January 2, 2022	Nick Perbix	2-year	
March 21, 2022	Max Crozier	2-year	
May 1, 2022	Maxim Groshev	3-year	
May 5, 2022	Mikey Eyssimont	2-year	
June 15, 2023	Cole Koepke	1-year	

== Draft picks ==
Below are the Tampa Bay Lightning's selections at the 2022 NHL entry draft, which was held on July 7 and 8, 2022, at the Bell Centre in Montreal, Quebec.

Round	#	Player	Pos	Nationality	College/Junior/Club team (League)
1	31	Isaac Howard	LW	United States	U.S. National Development Program (USHL)
3	86^{1}	Lucas Edmonds	RW	Sweden	Kingston Frontenacs (OHL)
5	160	Nick Malik	G	Czech Republic	KooKoo (Liiga)
6	192	Connor Kurth	RW	United States	Dubuque Fighting Saints (USHL)
7	223^{3}	Dyllan Gill	D	Canada	Rouyn-Noranda Huskies (QMJHL)
7	224	Klavs Veinbergs	LW	Latvia	HK Riga (MHL)

Notes:

1. The Pittsburgh Penguins' third-round pick went to the Tampa Bay Lightning as the result of a trade on July 8, 2022, that sent Chicago's fourth-round pick and Detroit's sixth-round pick both in 2022 (103rd and 169th overall) to Los Angeles in exchange for this pick.
2. The New York Rangers' seventh-round pick will go to the Tampa Bay Lightning as the result of a trade on July 17, 2021, that sent Barclay Goodrow to New York in exchange for this pick.
