= 2022–23 Boston Bruins season =

National Hockey League season

2022–23 Boston Bruins
- Presidents' Trophy winners
- Atlantic Division champions
- Division: 1st Atlantic
- Conference: 1st Eastern
- 2022–23 record: 65–12–5
- Home record: 34–4–3
- Road record: 31–8–2
- Goals for: 305
- Goals against: 177

Team information
- General manager: Don Sweeney
- Coach: Jim Montgomery
- Captain: Patrice Bergeron
- Alternate captains: David Krejci; Brad Marchand
- Arena: TD Garden
- Average attendance: 18,372
- Minor league affiliates: Providence Bruins (AHL); Maine Mariners (ECHL)

Team leaders
- Goals: David Pastrnak (61)
- Assists: David Pastrnak (52)
- Points: David Pastrnak (113)
- Penalty minutes: A. J. Greer (114)
- Plus/minus: Hampus Lindholm (+49)
- Wins: Linus Ullmark (40)
- Goals against average: Keith Kinkaid (1.00)

The 2022–23 Boston Bruins season was the 99th season for the National Hockey League (NHL) franchise that was established on November 1, 1924. In the offseason, the organization fired Bruce Cassidy, the team's head coach for the previous six seasons, and replaced him with Jim Montgomery. The season also saw the return of long-time Bruin David Krejci, who spent the previous season playing in the Czech Extraliga. The Bruins acquired players such as Pavel Zacha, via trade, and Tomas Nosek, via free agency, during the offseason, while also making trades for Dmitry Orlov, Garnet Hathaway, and Tyler Bertuzzi near the mid-season trade deadline to bolster their roster.

Regarded as one of the most, if not the most, successful regular season an NHL team has ever experienced, the Bruins finished the season as Atlantic Division winners, their third such title, and Presidents' Trophy winners for the fourth time in franchise history with a record-setting 135 points from 65 wins, 12 losses, and 5 overtime losses, with their 65 wins also serving as a new NHL win record. The Bruins set many additional records during the season, including the most consecutive home wins to start the season (14), the fastest team to reach both 80 and 100 points, and the fastest team to reach 50 wins. The Bruins also went 22 straight home games without a regulation loss to start the season before losing 3–0 to the Seattle Kraken.

Despite having an impressive regular season and securing home-ice advantage for the playoffs, the Bruins were upset in the first round by the eighth-seeded Florida Panthers in seven games after surrendering a 3–1 lead. Thus they joined the 2007 New England Patriots, 2001 Seattle Mariners, 1906 Chicago Cubs, and 2015–16 Golden State Warriors as all-time winningest regular season teams not to win their respective league's championship. Unlike those teams, however, the Bruins lost in the first round of the playoffs, while the Mariners reached the ALCS and the Patriots, Cubs, and Warriors all reached their respective championship series or game. This season served as the last for Krejci and fellow long-time Bruin Patrice Bergeron as they would retire during the ensuing offseason.

== Standings ==
=== Divisional standings ===
Atlantic Division
Pos	Team	GP	W	L	OTL	RW	GF	GA	GD	Pts
1	p – Boston Bruins	82	65	12	5	54	305	177	+128	135
2	x – Toronto Maple Leafs	82	50	21	11	42	279	222	+57	111
3	x – Tampa Bay Lightning	82	46	30	6	38	283	254	+29	98
4	x – Florida Panthers	82	42	32	8	36	290	273	+17	92
5	Buffalo Sabres	82	42	33	7	30	296	300	−4	91
6	Ottawa Senators	82	39	35	8	31	261	271	−10	86
7	Detroit Red Wings	82	35	37	10	28	240	279	−39	80
8	Montreal Canadiens	82	31	45	6	21	232	307	−75	68

Source: National Hockey League
Rules for classification: 1) Fewer number of games played (GP, only during regular season); 2) Greater number of regulation wins (RW); 3) Greater number of wins in regulation and overtime, excluding shootout wins (ROW); 4) Greater number of total wins, including shootouts (W); 5) Greater number of points earned in head-to-head play; if teams played an uneven number of head-to-head games, the result of the first game on the home ice of the team with the extra home game is discarded; 6) Greater goal differential (GD); 7) Greater number of goals scored (GF)
p – Clinched Presidents' Trophy; x – Clinched playoff spot

=== Conference standings ===
Eastern Conference Wild Card
Pos	Div	Team	GP	W	L	OTL	RW	GF	GA	GD	Pts
1	ME	x – New York Islanders	82	42	31	9	36	243	222	+21	93
2	AT	x – Florida Panthers	82	42	32	8	36	290	273	+17	92
3	ME	Pittsburgh Penguins	82	40	31	11	31	262	264	−2	91
4	AT	Buffalo Sabres	82	42	33	7	30	296	300	−4	91
5	AT	Ottawa Senators	82	39	35	8	31	261	271	−10	86
6	AT	Detroit Red Wings	82	35	37	10	28	240	279	−39	80
7	ME	Washington Capitals	82	35	37	10	27	255	265	−10	80
8	ME	Philadelphia Flyers	82	31	38	13	26	222	277	−55	75
9	AT	Montreal Canadiens	82	31	45	6	21	232	307	−75	68
10	ME	Columbus Blue Jackets	82	25	48	9	15	214	330	−116	59

Source: National Hockey League
Rules for classification: 1) Fewer number of games played (GP, only during regular season); 2) Greater number of regulation wins (RW); 3) Greater number of wins in regulation and overtime, excluding shootout wins (ROW); 4) Greater number of total wins, including shootouts (W); 5) Greater number of points earned in head-to-head play; if teams played an uneven number of head-to-head games, the result of the first game on the home ice of the team with the extra home game is discarded; 6) Greater goal differential (GD); 7) Greater number of goals scored (GF)
x – Clinched playoff spot

== Schedule and results ==
=== Regular season ===
2022–23 game log

October: 8–1–0 (home: 6–0–0; road: 2–1–0)
#	Date	Visitor	Score	Home	OT	Decision	Attendance	Record	Pts	Recap
1	October 12	Boston	5–2	Washington		Ullmark	18,573	1–0–0	2
2	October 15	Arizona	3–6	Boston		Swayman	17,850	2–0–0	4
3	October 17	Florida	3–5	Boston		Ullmark	17,850	3–0–0	6
4	October 18	Boston	5–7	Ottawa		Swayman	19,811	3–1–0	6
5	October 20	Anaheim	1–2	Boston	SO	Ullmark	17,850	4–1–0	8
6	October 22	Minnesota	3–4	Boston	OT	Ullmark	17,850	5–1–0	10
7	October 25	Dallas	1–3	Boston		Ullmark	17,850	6–1–0	12
8	October 27	Detroit	1–5	Boston		Swayman	17,850	7–1–0	14
9	October 28	Boston	4–0	Columbus		Ullmark	16,162	8–1–0	16

November: 11–2–0 (home: 7–0–0; road: 4–2–0)
#	Date	Visitor	Score	Home	OT	Decision	Attendance	Record	Pts	Recap
10	November 1	Boston	6–5	Pittsburgh	OT	Ullmark	17,629	9–1–0	18
11	November 3	Boston	5–2	NY Rangers		Ullmark	18,006	10–1–0	20
12	November 5	Boston	1–2	Toronto		Ullmark	18,926	10–2–0	20
13	November 7	St. Louis	1–3	Boston		Ullmark	17,850	11–2–0	22
14	November 10	Calgary	1–3	Boston		Ullmark	17,850	12–2–0	24
15	November 12	Boston	3–1	Buffalo		Kinkaid	19,070	13–2–0	26
16	November 13	Vancouver	2–5	Boston		Ullmark	17,850	14–2–0	28
17	November 17	Philadelphia	1–4	Boston		Ullmark	17,850	15–2–0	30
18	November 19	Chicago	1–6	Boston		Swayman	17,850	16–2–0	32
19	November 21	Boston	5–3	Tampa Bay		Ullmark	19,092	17–2–0	34
20	November 23	Boston	2–5	Florida		Swayman	17,511	17–3–0	34
21	November 25	Carolina	2–3	Boston	OT	Swayman	17,850	18–3–0	36
22	November 29	Tampa Bay	1–3	Boston		Swayman	17,850	19–3–0	38

December: 9–1–4 (home: 5–0–3; road: 4–1–1)
#	Date	Visitor	Score	Home	OT	Decision	Attendance	Record	Pts	Recap
23	December 3	Colorado	1–5	Boston		Ullmark	17,850	20–3–0	40
24	December 5	Vegas	4–3	Boston	SO	Swayman	17,850	20–3–1	41
25	December 7	Boston	4–0	Colorado		Ullmark	18,119	21–3–1	43
26	December 9	Boston	3–4	Arizona		Swayman	4,600	21–4–1	43
27	December 11	Boston	3–1	Vegas		Ullmark	18,114	22–4–1	45
28	December 13	NY Islanders	3–4	Boston	SO	Ullmark	17,850	23–4–1	47
29	December 15	Los Angeles	3–2	Boston	SO	Ullmark	17,850	23–4–2	48
30	December 17	Columbus	2–4	Boston		Swayman	17,850	24–4–2	50
31	December 19	Florida	3–7	Boston		Ullmark	17,850	25–4–2	52
32	December 22	Winnipeg	2–3	Boston		Swayman	17,850	26–4–2	54
33	December 23	Boston	4–3	New Jersey		Ullmark	16,514	27–4–2	56
34	December 27	Boston	2–3	Ottawa	SO	Swayman	20,016	27–4–3	57
35	December 28	Boston	3–1	New Jersey		Ullmark	16,514	28–4–3	59
36	December 31	Buffalo	4–3	Boston	OT	Swayman	17,850	28–4–4	60

January: 10–3–1 (home: 4–1–0; road: 6–2–1)
#	Date	Visitor	Score	Home	OT	Decision	Attendance	Record	Pts	Recap
37	January 2	Pittsburgh	1–2	Boston		Ullmark	39,243 (outdoors)	29–4–4	62
38	January 5	Boston	5–2	Los Angeles		Swayman	18,230	30–4–4	64
39	January 7	Boston	4–2	San Jose		Ullmark	17,562	31–4–4	66
40	January 8	Boston	7–1	Anaheim		Swayman	16,127	32–4–4	68
41	January 12	Seattle	3–0	Boston		Ullmark	17,850	32–5–4	68
42	January 14	Toronto	3–4	Boston		Ullmark	17,850	33–5–4	70
43	January 16	Philadelphia	0–6	Boston		Swayman	17,850	34–5–4	72
44	January 18	Boston	4–1	NY Islanders		Ullmark	17,255	35–5–4	74
45	January 19	Boston	3–1	NY Rangers		Swayman	18,006	36–5–4	76
46	January 22	San Jose	0–4	Boston		Ullmark	17,850	37–5–4	78
47	January 24	Boston	4–2	Montreal		Swayman	21,105	38–5–4	80
48	January 26	Boston	2–3	Tampa Bay		Ullmark	19,092	38–6–4	80
49	January 28	Boston	3–4	Florida	OT	Swayman	18,058	38–6–5	81
50	January 29	Boston	1–4	Carolina		Ullmark	18,959	38–7–5	81

February: 9–1–0 (home: 2–1–0; road: 7–0–0)
#	Date	Visitor	Score	Home	OT	Decision	Attendance	Record	Pts	Recap
51	February 1	Boston	5–2	Toronto		Ullmark	18,973	39–7–5	83
52	February 11	Washington	2–1	Boston		Swayman	17,850	39–8–5	83
53	February 14	Boston	3–2	Dallas	OT	Ullmark	18,532	40–8–5	85
54	February 16	Boston	5–0	Nashville		Swayman	17,159	41–8–5	87
55	February 18	NY Islanders	2–6	Boston		Ullmark	17,850	42–8–5	89
56	February 20	Ottawa	1–3	Boston		Ullmark	17,850	43–8–5	91
57	February 23	Boston	6–5	Seattle		Swayman	17,151	44–8–5	93
58	February 25	Boston	3–1	Vancouver		Ullmark	18,722	45–8–5	95
59	February 27	Boston	3–2	Edmonton		Swayman	18,347	46–8–5	97
60	February 28	Boston	4–3	Calgary	OT	Ullmark	18,420	47–8–5	99

March: 11–4–0 (home: 7–2–0; road: 4–2–0)
#	Date	Visitor	Score	Home	OT	Decision	Attendance	Record	Pts	Recap
61	March 2	Buffalo	1–7	Boston		Swayman	17,850	48–8–5	101
62	March 4	NY Rangers	2–4	Boston		Ullmark	17,850	49–8–5	103
63	March 9	Edmonton	3–2	Boston		Swayman	17,850	49–9–5	103
64	March 11	Detroit	2–3	Boston		Ullmark	17,850	50–9–5	105
65	March 12	Boston	3–5	Detroit		Swayman	19,515	50–10–5	105
66	March 14	Boston	3–6	Chicago		Ullmark	20,188	50–11–5	105
67	March 16	Boston	3–0	Winnipeg		Swayman	14,555	51–11–5	107
68	March 18	Boston	5–2	Minnesota		Ullmark	19,329	52–11–5	109
69	March 19	Boston	7–0	Buffalo		Swayman	19,070	53–11–5	111
70	March 21	Ottawa	1–2	Boston		Ullmark	17,850	54–11–5	113
71	March 23	Montreal	2–4	Boston		Swayman	17,850	55–11–5	115
72	March 25	Tampa Bay	1–2	Boston		Ullmark	17,850	56–11–5	117
73	March 26	Boston	4–3	Carolina	SO	Swayman	18,958	57–11–5	119
74	March 28	Nashville	2–1	Boston		Ullmark	17,850	57–12–5	119
75	March 30	Columbus	1–2	Boston	OT	Ullmark	17,850	58–12–5	121

April: 7–0–0 (home: 3–0–0; road: 4–0–0)
#	Date	Visitor	Score	Home	OT	Decision	Attendance	Record	Pts	Recap
76	April 1	Boston	4–3	Pittsburgh		Swayman	18,322	59–12–5	123
77	April 2	Boston	4–3	St. Louis	SO	Ullmark	18,096	60–12–5	125
78	April 6	Toronto	1–2	Boston	OT	Swayman	17,850	61–12–5	127
79	April 8	New Jersey	1–2	Boston		Ullmark	17,850	62–12–5	129
80	April 9	Boston	5–3	Philadelphia		Swayman	18,776	63–12–5	131
81	April 11	Washington	2–5	Boston		Ullmark	17,850	64–12–5	133
82	April 13	Boston	5–4	Montreal		Swayman	21,105	65–12–5	135

Legend: Win (2 points) Loss (0 points) Overtime/shootout loss (1 point)

=== Playoffs ===
2023 Stanley Cup playoffs

Eastern Conference First Round vs. (WC2) Florida Panthers: Florida won 4–3
#	Date	Visitor	Score	Home	OT	Decision	Attendance	Series	Recap
1	April 17	Florida	1–3	Boston		Ullmark	17,850	1–0
2	April 19	Florida	6–3	Boston		Ullmark	17,850	1–1
3	April 21	Boston	4–2	Florida		Ullmark	19,910	2–1
4	April 23	Boston	6–2	Florida		Ullmark	19,771	3–1
5	April 26	Florida	4–3	Boston	OT	Ullmark	17,850	3–2
6	April 28	Boston	5–7	Florida		Ullmark	18,911	3–3
7	April 30	Florida	4–3	Boston	OT	Swayman	17,850	3–4

Legend: Win Loss

== Player statistics ==
=== Skaters ===
Regular season
Player	GP	G	A	Pts	+/−	PIM
David Pastrnak	82	61	52	113	+34	38
Brad Marchand	73	21	46	67	+27	74
Patrice Bergeron	78	27	31	58	+35	22
Pavel Zacha	82	21	36	57	+26	16
David Krejci	70	16	40	56	+23	20
Hampus Lindholm	80	10	43	53	+49	56
Charlie McAvoy	67	7	45	52	+29	54
Jake DeBrusk	64	27	23	50	+26	16
Charlie Coyle	82	16	29	45	+29	30
Taylor Hall	61	16	20	36	+11	24
Trent Frederic	79	17	14	31	+28	57
Nick Foligno	60	10	16	26	+18	45
Matt Grzelcyk	75	4	22	26	+46	28
Connor Clifton	78	5	18	23	+20	60
Tomas Nosek	66	7	11	18	+9	48
Dmitry Orlov^{†}	23	4	13	17	+10	12
Tyler Bertuzzi^{†}	21	4	12	16	+4	6
Brandon Carlo	75	3	13	16	+44	38
A.J. Greer	61	5	7	12	+9	114
Derek Forbort	54	5	7	12	+12	23
Craig Smith^{‡}	42	4	6	10	+4	14
Jakub Lauko	23	4	3	7	+2	11
Garnet Hathaway^{†}	25	4	2	6	−1	17
Jakub Zboril	22	1	3	4	−1	6
Oskar Steen	3	1	0	1	0	0
Joona Koppanen	5	0	1	1	0	4
Connor Carrick	1	0	1	1	+3	0
Mike Reilly	10	0	1	1	0	2
Marc McLaughlin	2	0	0	0	−1	2
Jack Studnicka^{‡}	1	0	0	0	−1	4
Vinni Lettieri	1	0	0	0	−1	0
Dan Renouf	1	0	0	0	−3	0
Chris Wagner	1	0	0	0	0	0
Anton Stralman	8	0	0	0	−3	2

Playoffs
Player	GP	G	A	Pts	+/−	PIM
Tyler Bertuzzi	7	5	5	10	−4	26
Brad Marchand	7	4	6	10	−6	2
Taylor Hall	7	5	3	8	+4	2
Dmitry Orlov	7	0	8	8	−3	2
Jake DeBrusk	7	4	2	6	−1	10
Pavel Zacha	7	0	6	6	+1	2
David Pastrnak	7	5	0	5	−2	0
Charlie McAvoy	7	0	5	5	−3	8
David Krejci	4	1	3	4	−3	0
Brandon Carlo	7	0	4	4	+2	4
Nick Foligno	6	1	2	3	0	18
Charlie Coyle	7	1	1	2	−1	4
Tomas Nosek	7	0	2	2	0	0
Patrice Bergeron	3	1	0	1	−6	0
Jakub Lauko	3	0	1	1	+1	4
Garnet Hathaway	7	0	1	1	−1	10
Derek Forbort	7	0	1	1	−1	21
Trent Frederic	5	0	0	0	−2	10
Connor Clifton	3	0	0	0	−4	2
Matt Grzelcyk	4	0	0	0	−1	0
Hampus Lindholm	7	0	0	0	+2	4

=== Goaltenders ===
Regular season
Player	GP	GS	TOI	W	L	OT	GA	GAA	SA	SV%	SO	G	A	PIM
Linus Ullmark	49	48	2,882:12	40	6	1	91	1.89	1,457	.938	2	1	0	2
Jeremy Swayman	37	33	2,012:59	24	6	4	76	2.27	953	.920	4	0	0	2
Keith Kinkaid^{‡}	1	1	59:54	1	0	0	1	1.00	31	.968	0	0	0	0

Playoffs
Player	GP	GS	TOI	W	L	GA	GAA	SA	SV%	SO	G	A	PIM
Linus Ullmark	6	6	359:51	3	3	20	3.33	192	.896	0	0	1	10
Jeremy Swayman	2	1	71:46	0	1	4	3.34	32	.875	0	0	0	0

^{†}Denotes player spent time with another team before joining the Bruins. Stats reflect time with the Bruins only.
^{‡}Denotes player was traded mid-season. Stats reflect time with the Bruins only.

== Transactions ==
The Bruins have been involved in the following transactions during the 2022–23 season.

Key:

† Contract is entry-level.
‡ Contract initially takes effect in the 2023–24 season.

=== Trades ===
Date	Details		Ref
July 8, 2022	To Seattle Kraken CGY 3rd-round pick in 2022	To Boston Bruins WSH 4th-round pick in 2022; 5th-round pick in 2022	
July 8, 2022	To Los Angeles Kings 7th-round pick in 2022	To Boston Bruins 7th-round pick in 2023	
July 13, 2022	To New Jersey Devils Erik Haula	To Boston Bruins Pavel Zacha	
October 27, 2022	To Vancouver Canucks Jack Studnicka	To Boston Bruins Michael DiPietro; Jonathan Myrenberg	
February 23, 2023	To Washington Capitals Craig Smith; 1st-round pick in 2023; 3rd-round pick in 2024; 2nd-round pick in 2025	To Boston Bruins Garnet Hathaway; Andrei Svetlakov	
February 23, 2023	To Minnesota Wild 5th-round pick in 2023	To Boston Bruins Dmitry Orlov	
February 25, 2023	To Colorado Avalanche Keith Kinkaid	To Boston Bruins Shane Bowers	
March 2, 2023	To Detroit Red Wings conditional 1st-round pick in 2024; 4th-round pick in 2025	To Boston Bruins Tyler Bertuzzi	
June 26, 2023	To Chicago Blackhawks Nick Foligno; Taylor Hall	To Boston Bruins Ian Mitchell; Alec Regula	

=== Players acquired ===
Date	Player	Former team	Term	Via	Ref
July 13, 2022	Connor Carrick	Seattle Kraken	1-year	Free agency	
July 13, 2022	A. J. Greer	New Jersey Devils	2-year	Free agency	
July 13, 2022	Keith Kinkaid	New York Rangers	1-year	Free agency	
July 13, 2022	Vinni Lettieri	Anaheim Ducks	1-year	Free agency	
July 13, 2022	Dan Renouf	Detroit Red Wings	2-year	Free agency	
August 8, 2022	David Krejci	HC Olomouc (ELH)	1-year	Free agency	
October 12, 2022	Anton Stralman	Arizona Coyotes	1-year	Free agency	
November 4, 2022	Mitchell Miller	Tri-City Storm (USHL)	3-year†	Free agency	

=== Players lost ===
Date	Player	New team	Term	Via	Ref
July 13, 2022	Josh Brown	Arizona Coyotes	2-year	Free agency	
July 13, 2022	Steven Fogarty	Minnesota Wild	2-year	Free agency	
July 13, 2022	Jesper Froden	Seattle Kraken	1-year	Free agency	
July 13, 2022	Troy Grosenick	Philadelphia Flyers	1-year	Free agency	
July 13, 2022	Cameron Hughes	Seattle Kraken	2-year	Free agency	
July 13, 2022	Curtis Lazar	Vancouver Canucks	3-year	Free agency	
August 5, 2022	Anton Blidh	Colorado Avalanche	1-year	Free agency	
September 2, 2022	Kodie Curran	Metallurg Magnitogorsk (KHL)	1-year	Free agency	
September 27, 2022	Callum Booth	Coachella Valley Firebirds (AHL)	1-year	Free agency	
December 9, 2022	Victor Berglund			Contract termination	
December 10, 2022	Victor Berglund	HIFK (Liiga)	1-year	Free agency	
June 1, 2023	Kai Wissmann	Eisbären Berlin (DEL)	N/A‡	Free agency	

=== Signings ===
Date	Player	Term	Ref
July 18, 2022	Jack Ahcan	1-year	
July 18, 2022	Matt Filipe	1-year	
July 18, 2022	Ryan Mast	3-year†	
July 23, 2022	Jack Studnicka	2-year	
August 1, 2022	Brett Harrison	3-year†	
August 8, 2022	Patrice Bergeron	1-year	
August 8, 2022	Pavel Zacha	1-year	
March 2, 2023	David Pastrnak	8-year‡	
March 29, 2023	Trevor Kuntar	2-year†‡	
May 5, 2023	Matt Poitras	3-year†‡	
May 10, 2023	Mason Lohrei	2-year†‡	
June 19, 2023	Brandon Bussi	1-year‡	

== Draft picks ==
Below are the Boston Bruins' selections at the 2022 NHL entry draft, which was held on July 7 to 8, 2022, at Bell Centre in Montreal.

Round	#	Player	Pos.	Nationality	Team (League)
2	54	Matt Poitras	C	Canada	Guelph Storm (OHL)
4	117	Cole Spicer	C	USA	U.S. NTDP (USHL)
4	119	Dans Locmelis	C	Latvia	Luleå HF (J20 Nationell)
5	132	Frederic Brunet	D	Canada	Rimouski Océanic (QMJHL)
6	183	Reid Dyck	G	Canada	Swift Current Broncos (WHL)
7	200	Jackson Edward	D	Canada	London Knights (OHL)

== See also ==
- 2007 New England Patriots, a Boston sports team that became the first NFL team to complete a perfect 16-0 regular season.
- 2021 New England Revolution, a Boston-area sports team that set a regular-season points record for MLS, and also failed to advance in the playoffs.
