= Brett Howden =

Canadian ice hockey player (born 1998)

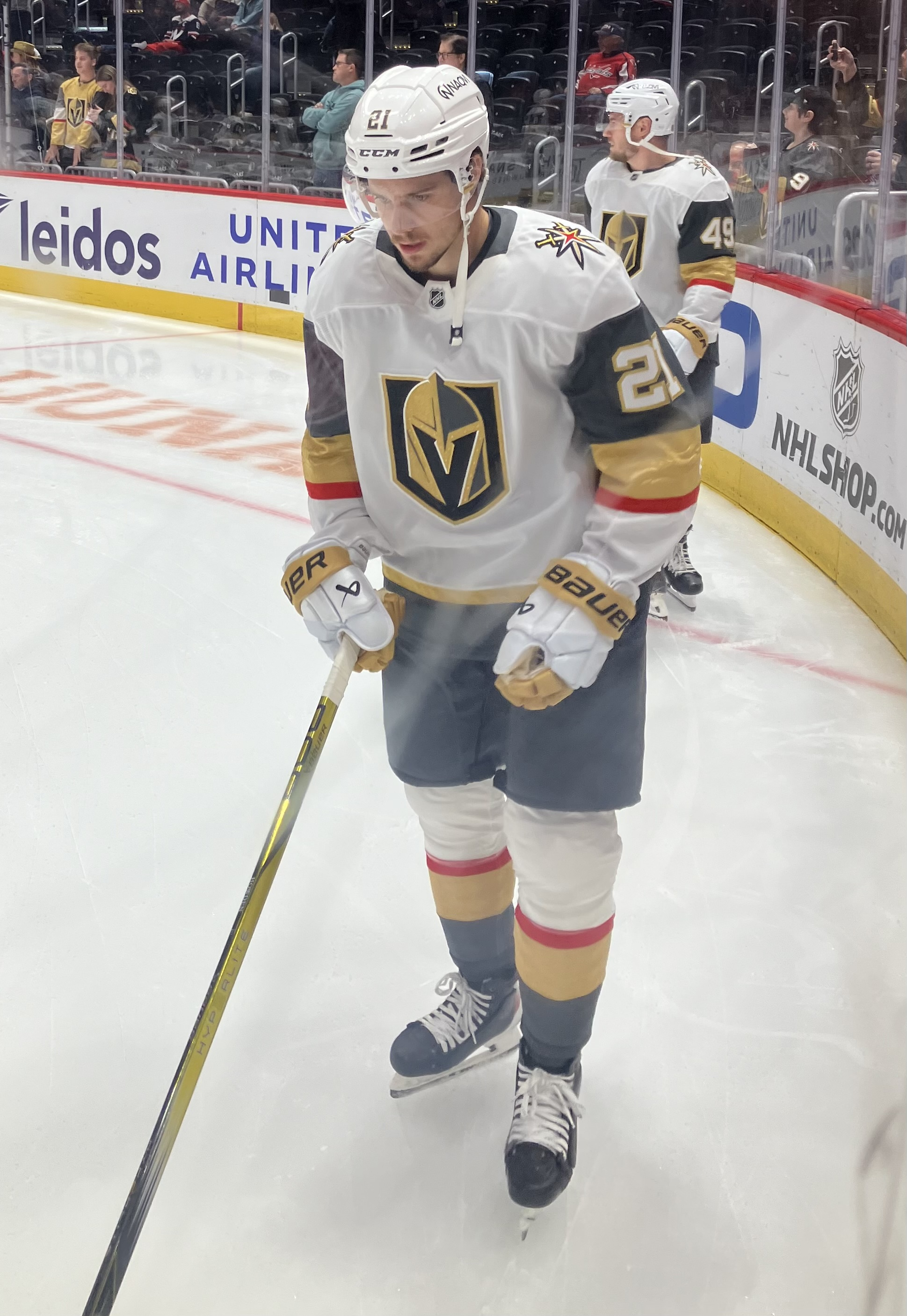
- Howden with the Vegas Golden Knights in 2024
- Born: March 29, 1998 (age 28) Oakbank, Manitoba, Canada
- Height: 6 ft 2 in (188 cm)
- Weight: 201 lb (91 kg; 14 st 5 lb)
- Position: Centre
- Shoots: Left
- NHL team Former teams: Vegas Golden Knights; New York Rangers
- NHL draft: 27th overall, 2016; Tampa Bay Lightning
- Playing career: 2017–present

Brett Howden (born March 29, 1998) is a Canadian professional ice hockey player who is a centre for the Vegas Golden Knights of the National Hockey League (NHL). Howden was drafted 27th overall in the 2016 NHL entry draft by the Tampa Bay Lightning. Howden is a Stanley Cup champion, having won with the Golden Knights in 2023.

== Playing career ==
=== Junior ===
On June 25, 2016, the Tampa Bay Lightning selected Howden with the 27th overall pick in the 2016 NHL entry draft. In the season leading up to the NHL draft, Howden recorded 24 goals and 40 assists over 68 games with the Moose Jaw Warriors of the Western Hockey League (WHL). Howden finished fourth on the team in goals and points, and also added four goals and 11 assists in 15 postseason games, which included four-straight multi-point games in the first round against the Prince Albert Raiders. In addition, Howden was named the Warriors' Rookie of the Year and Most Sportsmanlike Player during his rookie year in 2014–15. Howden has played two seasons with Lightning forward Brayden Point. Howden said that the team's familiarity with Point and their scouting of Moose Jaw played a role in their decision to select him. The team had spoken to Point about Howden leading up to the 2016 draft.

On September 30, 2016, the Warriors named Howden the 31st captain in team history. Howden previously served as alternate captain the previous season as a 17-year-old, and had also served as captain of Canada under-18 team, leading the team to a gold medal during the 2015 Ivan Hlinka Memorial Tournament. Howden credited former Warriors captain, Point, with his growth as a leader on the team.

On December 28, 2016, Howden signed a three-year, entry-level contract with the Tampa Bay Lightning.

=== Professional ===
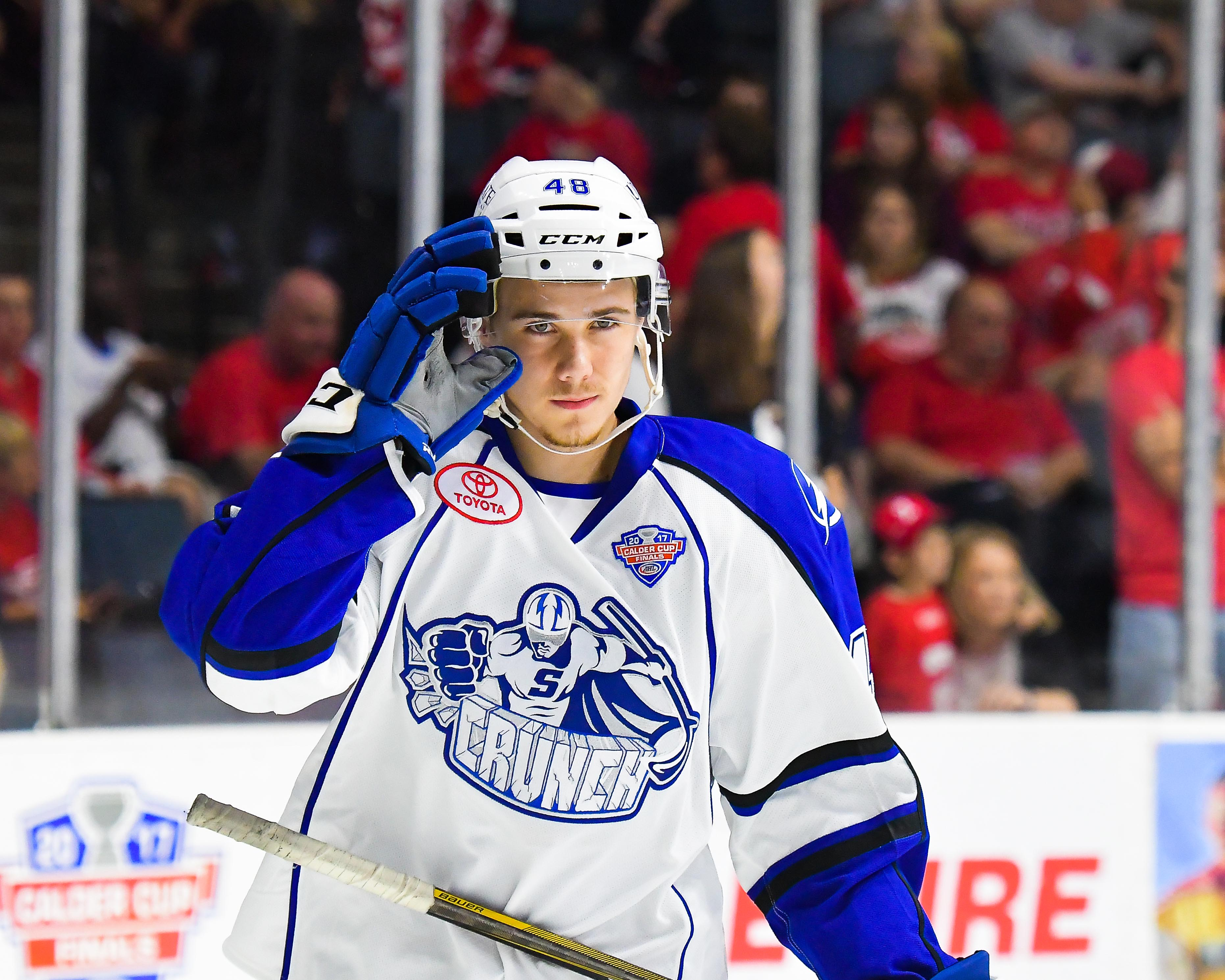
Howden with the Syracuse Crunch during the 2017 Calder Cup playoffs

After the Moose Jaw Warriors were eliminated from the 2017 WHL playoffs, Howden joined the Syracuse Crunch on an amateur tryout (ATO) agreement. On April 7, 2017, the Crunch's head coach, Benoit Groulx, announced that Howden would make his professional debut in a game against the Binghamton Senators. On April 8, Howden scored his first professional goal in Crunch's 3–2 win against the Albany Devils. On April 12, Howden recorded his first professional assist in a 7–2 win against the Utica Comets.

On February 26, 2018, Howden was traded to the New York Rangers, along with Vladislav Namestnikov, Libor Hájek, and 2018 and 2019 draft picks, for Ryan McDonagh and J. T. Miller.

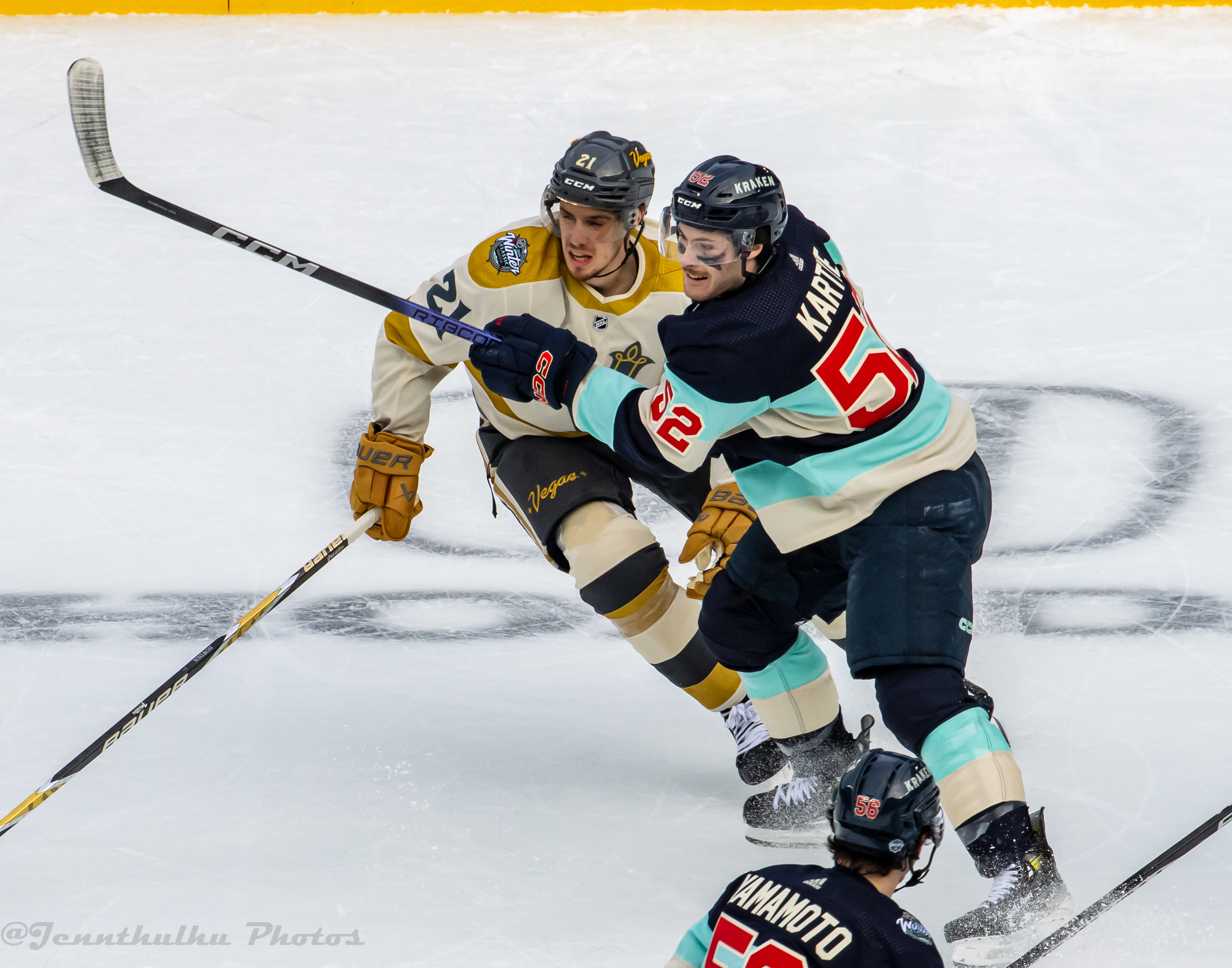
Howden (left) battling for position against Tye Kartye of the Seattle Kraken during the 2024 Winter Classic.

On July 17, 2021, Howden was traded to the Vegas Golden Knights in exchange for Nick DeSimone and a 2022 fourth-round pick. During the 2023 Stanley Cup playoffs, he contributed five goals and five assists as the Golden Knights won their first Stanley Cup in team history.

On November 22, 2024, during the 2024–25 season, and as a pending free agent, Howden signed a five-year extension with the Golden Knights, keeping him in Vegas through the 2029–30 season.

== International play ==
Medal record

Representing Canada

Men's ice hockey

World Junior Championships
| Gold medal – first place | 2018 USA | |

World U18 Championships
| Bronze medal – third place | 2015 Switzerland | |

Ivan Hlinka Memorial Tournament
| Gold medal – first place | 2015 Břeclav/Bratislava | |

On October 20, 2016, the Western Hockey League (WHL) announced its Team WHL roster for the 2016 CIBC Canada/Russia Series, which named Howden as one of its 12 forwards.

On November 29, 2016, Howden was announced as one of the Canada junior team invitees for the 2016 World Junior Championships training camp where Howden was joined by five other Lightning prospects. On December 13, 2016, Howden was released from the training camp as part of the initial roster cuts.

On December 6, 2017, Howden was named to the 2018 World Junior Championships selection camp roster.

== Personal life ==
Howden's brother, Quinton, was selected 25th overall in the 2010 NHL entry draft by the Florida Panthers.

Howden was one of 11 members involved in a group chat that discussed a 2018 incident, in which, a complainant, known as “E.M.”, alleged sexual assault by five members of the 2018 Canadian World Juniors team including Michael McLeod, Carter Hart, Alex Formenton, Dillon Dubé, and Cal Foote. He testified in court as a witness present in the room when the alleged assault took place. No charges were brought against Howden. During the trial, Howden took the stand, and at one point was accused by the Crown of "feigned memory loss." However, the trial judge later ruled that there was no basis to conclude that Howden had been untruthful about his lack of memory or of being "insincere."

== Career statistics ==
=== Regular season and playoffs ===
Bold indicates led league

| | | | Regular season | | | | | Playoffs |
| Season | Team | League | GP | G | A | Pts | PIM | GP | G | A | Pts | PIM |
|---|---|---|---|---|---|---|---|---|---|---|---|---|
| 2013–14 | Moose Jaw Warriors | WHL | 5 | 1 | 0 | 1 | 2 | — | — | — | — | — |
| 2014–15 | Moose Jaw Warriors | WHL | 68 | 22 | 24 | 46 | 24 | — | — | — | — | — |
| 2015–16 | Moose Jaw Warriors | WHL | 68 | 24 | 40 | 64 | 61 | 10 | 4 | 11 | 15 | 4 |
| 2016–17 | Moose Jaw Warriors | WHL | 58 | 38 | 43 | 81 | 73 | 7 | 2 | 1 | 3 | 12 |
| 2016–17 | Syracuse Crunch | AHL | 5 | 3 | 1 | 4 | 2 | 3 | 0 | 2 | 2 | 0 |
| 2017–18 | Moose Jaw Warriors | WHL | 49 | 24 | 51 | 75 | 42 | 14 | 7 | 8 | 15 | 8 |
| 2018–19 | New York Rangers | NHL | 66 | 6 | 17 | 23 | 14 | — | — | — | — | — |
| 2019–20 | New York Rangers | NHL | 70 | 9 | 10 | 19 | 28 | 3 | 0 | 0 | 0 | 4 |
| 2020–21 | New York Rangers | NHL | 42 | 1 | 6 | 7 | 11 | — | — | — | — | — |
| 2021–22 | Vegas Golden Knights | NHL | 47 | 9 | 11 | 20 | 12 | — | — | — | — | — |
| 2022–23 | Vegas Golden Knights | NHL | 54 | 6 | 7 | 13 | 55 | 22 | 5 | 5 | 10 | 31 |
| 2023–24 | Vegas Golden Knights | NHL | 72 | 8 | 11 | 19 | 39 | 7 | 1 | 1 | 2 | 0 |
| 2024–25 | Vegas Golden Knights | NHL | 80 | 23 | 17 | 40 | 46 | 11 | 3 | 0 | 3 | 4 |
| 2025–26 | Vegas Golden Knights | NHL | 58 | 12 | 10 | 22 | 41 | 22 | **14** | 4 | 18 | 6 |
| NHL totals | | | 489 | 74 | 89 | 163 | 246 | 65 | 23 | 10 | 33 | 45 |

=== International ===
| Year | Team | Event | Result | GP | G | A | Pts | PIM |
|---|---|---|---|---|---|---|---|---|
| 2014 | Canada White | U17 | 5th | 5 | 2 | 1 | 3 | 4 |
| 2015 | Canada | U18 | 3rd place, bronze medalist(s) | 3 | 2 | 1 | 3 | 0 |
| 2015 | Canada | IH18 | 1st place, gold medalist(s) | 4 | 0 | 1 | 1 | 4 |
| 2016 | Canada | U18 | 4th | 6 | 5 | 3 | 8 | 8 |
| 2018 | Canada | WJC | 1st place, gold medalist(s) | 7 | 3 | 4 | 7 | 4 |
| Junior totals | | | | 25 | 12 | 10 | 22 | 20 |

== Awards and honours ==
| Award | Year | Ref |
NHL
| Stanley Cup champion | 2023 | |

Awards and achievements
| Preceded by Tony DeAngelo | Tampa Bay Lightning first-round draft pick 2016 | Succeeded by Cal Foote |
