= List of 2022–23 NHL Three Star Awards =

The 2022–23 NHL Three Star Awards are the way the National Hockey League denotes its players of the week and players of the month of the 2022–23 season.

== Weekly ==
Weekly
Week	First Star	Second Star	Third Star
October 16, 2022	Sidney Crosby (Pittsburgh Penguins)	Connor McDavid (Edmonton Oilers)	Jake Oettinger (Dallas Stars)
October 23, 2022	Rasmus Dahlin (Buffalo Sabres)	Brady Tkachuk (Ottawa Senators)	Mackenzie Blackwood (New Jersey Devils)
October 30, 2022	Connor McDavid (Edmonton Oilers)	Jesper Bratt (New Jersey Devils)	Marc-Andre Fleury (Minnesota Wild)
November 6, 2022	Jason Robertson (Dallas Stars)	Nathan MacKinnon (Colorado Avalanche)	Erik Karlsson (San Jose Sharks)
November 13, 2022	Mikko Rantanen (Colorado Avalanche)	Linus Ullmark (Boston Bruins)	Adam Fox (New York Rangers)
November 20, 2022	Sidney Crosby (Pittsburgh Penguins)	Pavel Buchnevich (St. Louis Blues)	Martin Jones (Seattle Kraken)
November 27, 2022	Jason Robertson (Dallas Stars)	Josh Morrissey (Winnipeg Jets)	Ilya Sorokin (New York Islanders)
December 4, 2022	Connor McDavid (Edmonton Oilers)	Dylan Cozens (Buffalo Sabres)	Jason Robertson (Dallas Stars)
December 11, 2022	Charlie Lindgren (Washington Capitals)	Tage Thompson (Buffalo Sabres)	William Nylander (Toronto Maple Leafs)
December 18, 2022	Alexander Ovechkin (Washington Capitals)	Tage Thompson (Buffalo Sabres)	Mats Zuccarello (Minnesota Wild)
December 25, 2022	Alexander Ovechkin (Washington Capitals)	Alexandar Georgiev (Colorado Avalanche)	Elias Pettersson (Vancouver Canucks)
January 1, 2023	Filip Forsberg (Nashville Predators)	Erik Karlsson (San Jose Sharks)	Antti Raanta (Carolina Hurricanes)
January 8, 2023	David Pastrnak (Boston Bruins)	Jack Hughes (New Jersey Devils)	Rasmus Dahlin (Buffalo Sabres)
January 15, 2023	Martin Jones (Seattle Kraken)	Lucas Raymond (Detroit Red Wings)	Nikita Kucherov (Tampa Bay Lightning)
January 22, 2023	Zach Hyman (Edmonton Oilers)	Steven Stamkos (Tampa Bay Lightning)	Trevor Zegras (Anaheim Ducks)
January 29, 2023	Claude Giroux (Ottawa Senators)	William Nylander (Toronto Maple Leafs)	Andrei Vasilevskiy (Tampa Bay Lightning)
February 5, 2023 (Note: For performances in the All-Star Game.)	Matthew Tkachuk (Florida Panthers)	Dylan Larkin (Detroit Red Wings)	Mitch Marner (Toronto Maple Leafs)
February 12, 2023	Artemi Panarin (New York Rangers)	Erik Karlsson (San Jose Sharks)	Clayton Keller (Arizona Coyotes)
February 19, 2023	Tim Stützle (Ottawa Senators)	Nathan MacKinnon (Colorado Avalanche)	Dylan Larkin (Detroit Red Wings)
February 26, 2023	Connor McDavid (Edmonton Oilers)	Linus Ullmark (Boston Bruins)	John Gibson (Anaheim Ducks)
March 5, 2023	Dmitry Orlov (Boston Bruins)	Claude Giroux (Ottawa Senators)	Filip Gustavsson (Minnesota Wild)
March 12, 2023	Clayton Keller (Arizona Coyotes)	Sidney Crosby (Pittsburgh Penguins)	Mitch Marner (Toronto Maple Leafs)
March 19, 2023	Mika Zibanejad (New York Rangers)	Cale Makar (Colorado Avalanche)	Jeremy Swayman (Boston Bruins)
March 26, 2023	Viktor Arvidsson (Los Angeles Kings)	Nick Suzuki (Montreal Canadiens)	Filip Gustavsson (Minnesota Wild)
April 2, 2023	Andrei Vasilevskiy (Tampa Bay Lightning)	Leon Draisaitl (Edmonton Oilers)	David Pastrnak (Boston Bruins)
April 9, 2023	Nathan MacKinnon (Colorado Avalanche)	Jordan Eberle (Seattle Kraken)	Alex Lyon (Florida Panthers)
April 14, 2023	Jason Robertson (Dallas Stars)	Brent Burns (Carolina Hurricanes)	Laurent Brossoit (Vegas Golden Knights)

== Monthly ==
Monthly
Month	First Star	Second Star	Third Star
October	Connor McDavid (Edmonton Oilers)	David Pastrnak (Boston Bruins)	Artemi Panarin (New York Rangers)
November	Jason Robertson (Dallas Stars)	Vitek Vanecek (New Jersey Devils)	Mitch Marner (Toronto Maple Leafs)
December	Alexander Ovechkin (Washington Capitals)	Connor McDavid (Edmonton Oilers)	Tage Thompson (Buffalo Sabres)
January	Jack Hughes (New Jersey Devils)	David Pastrnak (Boston Bruins)	Vince Dunn (Seattle Kraken)
February	Connor McDavid (Edmonton Oilers)	Nathan MacKinnon (Colorado Avalanche)	Linus Ullmark (Boston Bruins)
March	Connor McDavid (Edmonton Oilers)	Leon Draisaitl (Edmonton Oilers)	Clayton Keller (Arizona Coyotes)

== Rookie of the Month ==
Rookie of the Month
Month	Player
October	Shane Pinto (Ottawa Senators)
November	Logan Thompson (Vegas Golden Knights)
December	Pyotr Kochetkov (Carolina Hurricanes)
January	Ukko-Pekka Luukkonen (Buffalo Sabres)
February	Mads Sogaard (Ottawa Senators)
March	Stuart Skinner (Edmonton Oilers)
