= 2022–23 Edmonton Oilers season =

Season of play of professional ice hockey team

2022–23 Edmonton Oilers
- Division: 2nd Pacific
- Conference: 2nd Western
- 2022–23 record: 50–23–9
- Home record: 23–12–6
- Road record: 27–11–3
- Goals for: 325
- Goals against: 260

Team information
- General manager: Ken Holland
- Coach: Jay Woodcroft
- Captain: Connor McDavid
- Alternate captains: Leon Draisaitl; Ryan Nugent-Hopkins; Darnell Nurse
- Arena: Rogers Place
- Average attendance: 17,838
- Minor league affiliates: Bakersfield Condors (AHL); Fort Wayne Komets (ECHL)

Team leaders
- Goals: Connor McDavid (64)
- Assists: Connor McDavid (89)
- Points: Connor McDavid (153)
- Penalty minutes: Klim Kostin (66)
- Plus/minus: Mattias Ekholm (+28)
- Wins: Stuart Skinner (29)
- Goals against average: Stuart Skinner (2.75)

The 2022–23 Edmonton Oilers season was the 44th season for the National Hockey League (NHL) franchise that was established on June 22, 1979, and 51st season for the organization overall, including their play in the World Hockey Association (WHA).

On April 1, 2023, the Oilers clinched a playoff berth after a win over the Anaheim Ducks.

The Oilers became the first NHL team since the 1995–96 Pittsburgh Penguins to have three players surpass the 100-point plateau, with Connor McDavid, Leon Draisaitl, and Ryan Nugent-Hopkins all achieving the feat.

In the playoffs, the Oilers defeated the Los Angeles Kings in six games, before losing to the eventual Stanley Cup winning Vegas Golden Knights in the Second Round.

== Standings ==
=== Divisional standings ===
Pacific Division
Pos	Team	GP	W	L	OTL	RW	GF	GA	GD	Pts
1	z – Vegas Golden Knights	82	51	22	9	38	272	229	+43	111
2	x – Edmonton Oilers	82	50	23	9	45	325	260	+65	109
3	x – Los Angeles Kings	82	47	25	10	37	280	257	+23	104
4	x – Seattle Kraken	82	46	28	8	37	289	256	+33	100
5	Calgary Flames	82	38	27	17	31	260	252	+8	93
6	Vancouver Canucks	82	38	37	7	24	276	298	−22	83
7	San Jose Sharks	82	22	44	16	16	234	321	−87	60
8	Anaheim Ducks	82	23	47	12	13	209	338	−129	58

Source: National Hockey League
Rules for classification: 1) Fewer number of games played (GP, only during regular season); 2) Greater number of regulation wins (RW); 3) Greater number of wins in regulation and overtime, excluding shootout wins (ROW); 4) Greater number of total wins, including shootouts (W); 5) Greater number of points earned in head-to-head play; if teams played an uneven number of head-to-head games, the result of the first game on the home ice of the team with the extra home game is discarded; 6) Greater goal differential (GD); 7) Greater number of goals scored (GF)
x – Clinched playoff spot; z – Clinched conference

=== Conference standings ===
Western Conference Wild Card
Pos	Div	Team	GP	W	L	OTL	RW	GF	GA	GD	Pts
1	PA	x – Seattle Kraken	82	46	28	8	37	289	256	+33	100
2	CE	x – Winnipeg Jets	82	46	33	3	36	247	225	+22	95
3	PA	Calgary Flames	82	38	27	17	31	260	252	+8	93
4	CE	Nashville Predators	82	42	32	8	29	229	238	−9	92
5	PA	Vancouver Canucks	82	38	37	7	24	276	298	−22	83
6	CE	St. Louis Blues	82	37	38	7	27	263	301	−38	81
7	CE	Arizona Coyotes	82	28	40	14	20	228	299	−71	70
8	PA	San Jose Sharks	82	22	44	16	16	234	321	−87	60
9	CE	Chicago Blackhawks	82	26	49	7	18	204	301	−97	59
10	PA	Anaheim Ducks	82	23	47	12	13	209	338	−129	58

Source: National Hockey League
Rules for classification: 1) Fewer number of games played (GP, only during regular season); 2) Greater number of regulation wins (RW); 3) Greater number of wins in regulation and overtime, excluding shootout wins (ROW); 4) Greater number of total wins, including shootouts (W); 5) Greater number of points earned in head-to-head play; if teams played an uneven number of head-to-head games, the result of the first game on the home ice of the team with the extra home game is discarded; 6) Greater goal differential (GD); 7) Greater number of goals scored (GF)
x – Clinched playoff spot

== Schedule and results ==
=== Preseason ===
The preseason schedule was published on July 5, 2022.

2022 preseason game log: 5–3–0 (home: 4–0–0; road: 1–3–0)
#	Date	Visitor	Score	Home	OT	Decision	Attendance	Record	Recap
1	September 25	Winnipeg	0–4	Edmonton		Skinner	15,979	1–0–0
2	September 26	Edmonton	0–3	Seattle		Rodrigue	17,151	1–1–0
3	September 28	Edmonton	0–4	Calgary		Pickard	16,598	1–2–0
4	September 30	Calgary	1–2	Edmonton		Pickard	18,347	2–2–0
5	October 1	Edmonton	3–2	Winnipeg	SO	Skinner	14,190	3–2–0
6	October 3	Vancouver	2–7	Edmonton		Campbell	15,716	4–2–0
7	October 5	Edmonton	4–5	Vancouver		Skinner	7,046	4–3–0
8	October 7	Seattle	3–5	Edmonton		Campbell	17,328	5–3–0

=== Regular season ===
The regular season schedule was released on July 6, 2022.

2022–23 game log

October: 6–3–0 (home: 3–3–0; road: 3–0–0)
#	Date	Visitor	Score	Home	OT	Decision	Attendance	Record	Pts	Recap
1	October 12	Vancouver	3–5	Edmonton		Campbell	18,347	1–0–0	2
2	October 15	Calgary	4–3	Edmonton		Campbell	18,347	1–1–0	2
3	October 18	Buffalo	4–2	Edmonton		Skinner	16,121	1–2–0	2
4	October 20	Carolina	4–6	Edmonton		Campbell	16,023	2–2–0	4
5	October 22	St. Louis	2–0	Edmonton		Campbell	17,102	2–3–0	4
6	October 24	Pittsburgh	3–6	Edmonton		Campbell	17,392	3–3–0	6
7	October 26	Edmonton	3–1	St. Louis		Skinner	18,096	4–3–0	8
8	October 27	Edmonton	6–5	Chicago		Campbell	13,685	5–3–0	10
9	October 29	Edmonton	3–2	Calgary		Skinner	19,289	6–3–0	12

November: 7–7–0 (home: 3–3–0; road: 4–4–0)
#	Date	Visitor	Score	Home	OT	Decision	Attendance	Record	Pts	Recap
10	November 1	Nashville	4–7	Edmonton		Campbell	16,812	7–3–0	14
11	November 3	New Jersey	4–3	Edmonton		Skinner	17,021	7–4–0	14
12	November 5	Dallas	6–2	Edmonton		Campbell	17,067	7–5–0	14
13	November 7	Edmonton	4–5	Washington		Skinner	18,573	7–6–0	14
14	November 8	Edmonton	3–2	Tampa Bay		Campbell	19,092	8–6–0	16
15	November 10	Edmonton	2–7	Carolina		Campbell	18,118	8–7–0	16
16	November 12	Edmonton	4–2	Florida		Skinner	16,579	9–7–0	18
17	November 16	Los Angeles	3–1	Edmonton		Skinner	16,943	9–8–0	18
18	November 19	Vegas	3–4	Edmonton	OT	Skinner	18,347	10–8–0	20
19	November 21	Edmonton	2–5	New Jersey		Skinner	16,514	10–9–0	20
20	November 23	Edmonton	0–3	NY Islanders		Campbell	17,255	10–10–0	20
21	November 26	Edmonton	4–3	NY Rangers		Campbell	18,006	11–10–0	22
22	November 28	Florida	3–4	Edmonton	OT	Skinner	17,775	12–10–0	24
23	November 30	Edmonton	5–4	Chicago		Skinner	15,397	13–10–0	26

December: 7–6–2 (home: 3–4–1; road: 3–3–1)
#	Date	Visitor	Score	Home	OT	Decision	Attendance	Record	Pts	Recap
24	December 1	Edmonton	3–5	Minnesota		Campbell	17,651	13–11–0	26
25	December 3	Montreal	3–5	Edmonton		Skinner	18,347	14–11–0	28
26	December 5	Washington	3–2	Edmonton		Skinner	17,264	14–12–0	28
27	December 7	Arizona	2–8	Edmonton		Skinner	16,633	15–12–0	30
28	December 9	Minnesota	2–5	Edmonton		Skinner	17,589	16–12–0	32
29	December 12	Edmonton	1–2	Minnesota		Skinner	17,707	16–13–0	32
30	December 13	Edmonton	6–3	Nashville		Campbell	17,159	17–13–0	34
31	December 15	St. Louis	4–3	Edmonton	SO	Skinner	17,550	17–13–1	35
32	December 17	Anaheim	4–3	Edmonton		Skinner	18,296	17–14–1	35
33	December 19	Edmonton	3–4	Nashville	OT	Campbell	17,558	17–14–2	36
34	December 21	Edmonton	6–3	Dallas		Skinner	18,532	18–14–2	38
35	December 23	Vancouver	5–2	Edmonton		Skinner	18,347	18–15–2	38
36	December 27	Edmonton	2–1	Calgary		Skinner	19,289	19–15–2	40
37	December 30	Edmonton	7–2	Seattle		Skinner	17,151	20–15–2	42
38	December 31	Winnipeg	2–1	Edmonton		Campbell	18,347	20–16–2	42

January: 8–2–2 (home: 4–1–2; road: 4–1–0)
#	Date	Visitor	Score	Home	OT	Decision	Attendance	Record	Pts	Recap
39	January 3	Seattle	5–2	Edmonton		Skinner	18,297	20–17–2	42
40	January 5	NY Islanders	2–4	Edmonton		Campbell	17,755	21–17–2	44
41	January 7	Colorado	3–2	Edmonton	OT	Skinner	18,347	21–17–3	45
42	January 9	Edmonton	3–6	Los Angeles		Campbell	16,039	21–18–3	45
43	January 11	Edmonton	6–2	Anaheim		Campbell	16,963	22–18–3	47
44	January 13	Edmonton	7–1	San Jose		Campbell	15,887	23–18–3	49
45	January 14	Edmonton	4–3	Vegas		Campbell	18,143	24–18–3	51
46	January 17	Seattle	2–5	Edmonton		Campbell	18,183	25–18–3	53
47	January 19	Tampa Bay	3–5	Edmonton		Campbell	17,742	26–18–3	55
48	January 21	Edmonton	4–2	Vancouver		Skinner	18,977	27–18–3	57
49	January 25	Columbus	3–2	Edmonton	OT	Skinner	16,986	27–18–4	58
50	January 28	Chicago	3–7	Edmonton		Campbell	18,347	28–18–4	60

February: 4–3–4 (home: 1–1–2; road: 3–2–2)
#	Date	Visitor	Score	Home	OT	Decision	Attendance	Record	Pts	Recap
51	February 7	Edmonton	5–2	Detroit		Campbell	19,515	29–18–4	62
52	February 9	Edmonton	1–2	Philadelphia	SO	Skinner	18,851	29–18–5	63
53	February 11	Edmonton	6–3	Ottawa		Campbell	20,041	30–18–5	65
54	February 12	Edmonton	2–6	Montreal		Skinner	21,105	30–19–5	65
55	February 15	Detroit	5–4	Edmonton	SO	Campbell	17,627	30–19–6	66
56	February 17	NY Rangers	5–4	Edmonton	SO	Campbell	18,347	30–19–7	67
57	February 19	Edmonton	5–6	Colorado	OT	Campbell	18,134	30–19–8	68
58	February 21	Philadelphia	2–4	Edmonton		Skinner	18,347	31–19–8	70
59	February 23	Edmonton	7–2	Pittsburgh		Skinner	18,400	32–19–8	72
60	February 25	Edmonton	5–6	Columbus		Skinner	19,004	32–20–8	72
61	February 27	Boston	3–2	Edmonton		Skinner	18,347	32–21–8	72

March: 12–2–1 (home: 7–0–1; road: 5–2–0)
#	Date	Visitor	Score	Home	OT	Decision	Attendance	Record	Pts	Recap
62	March 1	Toronto	2–5	Edmonton		Skinner	18,347	33–21–8	74
63	March 3	Winnipeg	3–6	Edmonton		Skinner	18,347	34–21–8	76
64	March 4	Edmonton	5–7	Winnipeg		Campbell	15,324	34–22–8	76
65	March 6	Edmonton	3–2	Buffalo		Skinner	17,634	35–22–8	78
66	March 9	Edmonton	3–2	Boston		Skinner	17,850	36–22–8	80
67	March 11	Edmonton	4–7	Toronto		Skinner	19,549	36–23–8	80
68	March 14	Ottawa	3–6	Edmonton		Skinner	18,347	37–23–8	82
69	March 16	Dallas	1–4	Edmonton		Skinner	18,347	38–23–8	84
70	March 18	Edmonton	6–4	Seattle		Skinner	17,171	39–23–8	86
71	March 20	San Jose	4–5	Edmonton	OT	Campbell	18,347	40–23–8	88
72	March 22	Arizona	3–4	Edmonton	OT	Skinner	18,225	41–23–8	90
73	March 25	Vegas	4–3	Edmonton	OT	Skinner	18,347	41–23–9	91
74	March 27	Edmonton	5–4	Arizona		Campbell	4,600	42–23–9	93
75	March 28	Edmonton	7–4	Vegas		Skinner	18,391	43–23–9	95
76	March 30	Los Angeles	0–2	Edmonton		Skinner	18,347	44–23–9	97

April: 6–0–0 (home: 2–0–0; road: 4–0–0)
#	Date	Visitor	Score	Home	OT	Decision	Attendance	Record	Pts	Recap
77	April 1	Anaheim	0–6	Edmonton		Campbell	18,347	45–23–9	99
78	April 4	Edmonton	3–1	Los Angeles		Skinner	18,230	46–23–9	101
79	April 5	Edmonton	3–1	Anaheim		Campbell	16,018	47–23–9	103
80	April 8	Edmonton	6–1	San Jose		Skinner	17,562	48–23–9	105
81	April 11	Edmonton	2–1	Colorado	OT	Skinner	18,135	49–23–9	107
82	April 13	San Jose	2–5	Edmonton		Skinner	18,347	50–23–9	109

Legend: Win (2 points) Loss (0 points) Overtime/shootout loss (1 point)

=== Playoffs ===
2023 Stanley Cup playoffs

Western Conference First Round vs. (P3) Los Angeles Kings: Edmonton won 4–2
#	Date	Visitor	Score	Home	OT	Decision	Attendance	Series	Recap
1	April 17	Los Angeles	4–3	Edmonton	OT	Skinner	18,347	0–1
2	April 19	Los Angeles	2–4	Edmonton		Skinner	18,347	1–1
3	April 21	Edmonton	2–3	Los Angeles	OT	Skinner	18,230	1–2
4	April 23	Edmonton	5–4	Los Angeles	OT	Campbell	18,367	2–2
5	April 25	Los Angeles	3–6	Edmonton		Skinner	18,347	3–2
6	April 29	Edmonton	5–4	Los Angeles		Skinner	18,230	4–2

Western Conference Second Round vs. (P1) Vegas Golden Knights: Vegas won 4–2
#	Date	Visitor	Score	Home	OT	Decision	Attendance	Series	Recap
1	May 3	Edmonton	4–6	Vegas		Skinner	18,243	0–1
2	May 6	Edmonton	5–1	Vegas		Skinner	18,504	1–1
3	May 8	Vegas	5–1	Edmonton		Skinner	18,347	1–2
4	May 10	Vegas	1–4	Edmonton		Skinner	18,347	2–2
5	May 12	Edmonton	3–4	Vegas		Skinner	18,519	2–3
6	May 14	Vegas	5–2	Edmonton		Skinner	18,347	2–4

Legend: Win Loss

== Player statistics ==
=== Skaters ===
Regular season
Player	GP	G	A	Pts	+/−	PIM
Connor McDavid	82	64	89	153	+22	36
Leon Draisaitl	80	52	76	128	+7	24
Ryan Nugent-Hopkins	82	37	67	104	+12	35
Zach Hyman	79	36	47	83	+13	39
Darnell Nurse	82	12	31	43	+26	64
Tyson Barrie^{‡}	61	10	33	43	−3	26
Evan Bouchard	82	8	32	40	+6	28
Evander Kane	41	16	12	28	−4	53
Warren Foegele	67	13	15	28	+7	28
Mattias Janmark	66	10	15	25	+4	18
Kailer Yamamoto	58	10	15	25	+12	24
Ryan McLeod	57	11	12	23	+4	18
Klim Kostin	57	11	10	21	+12	66
Derek Ryan	80	13	7	20	+11	28
Brett Kulak	82	3	17	20	+11	41
Cody Ceci	80	1	14	15	+11	24
Jesse Puljujarvi^{‡}	58	5	9	14	−11	30
Mattias Ekholm^{†}	21	4	10	14	+28	4
Dylan Holloway	51	3	6	9	0	27
Devin Shore	47	1	8	9	+6	4
Philip Broberg	46	1	7	8	+6	2
Nick Bjugstad^{†}	19	4	2	6	+6	8
Vincent Desharnais	36	0	5	5	+15	31
Ryan Murray	13	0	3	3	−4	4
Brad Malone	10	0	0	0	−4	6
Jason Demers	1	0	0	0	−1	0
Markus Niemelainen	23	0	0	0	+3	4
Tyler Benson	2	0	0	0	0	0
James Hamblin	10	0	0	0	−3	2

Playoffs
Player	GP	G	A	Pts	+/−	PIM
Connor McDavid	12	8	12	20	−1	0
Leon Draisaitl	12	13	5	18	−1	10
Evan Bouchard	12	4	13	17	−4	4
Zach Hyman	12	3	8	11	+1	12
Ryan Nugent-Hopkins	12	1	10	11	−6	4
Mattias Ekholm	12	1	6	7	0	8
Evander Kane	12	3	2	5	−3	46
Klim Kostin	12	3	2	5	+2	9
Ryan McLeod	12	0	5	5	−1	2
Kailer Yamamoto	12	1	3	4	−7	18
Darnell Nurse	11	0	4	4	−2	21
Nick Bjugstad	12	3	0	3	−2	16
Warren Foegele	12	2	1	3	−2	16
Derek Ryan	11	1	2	3	+3	0
Brett Kulak	12	1	1	2	+3	9
Vincent Desharnais	12	0	2	2	−3	8
Cody Ceci	12	0	1	1	−5	2
Mattias Janmark	5	0	1	1	+1	2
Philip Broberg	9	0	0	0	+3	4

=== Goaltenders ===
Regular season
Player	GP	GS	TOI	W	L	OT	GA	GAA	SA	SV%	SO	G	A	PIM
Stuart Skinner	50	48	2,903:05	29	14	5	133	2.75	1,536	.914	1	0	2	0
Jack Campbell	36	34	2,026:23	21	9	4	115	3.41	1,027	.888	1	0	1	2
Matt Berlin	1	0	2:26	0	0	0	0	0.00	1	1.000	0	0	0	0

Playoffs
Player	GP	GS	TOI	W	L	GA	GAA	SA	SV%	SO	G	A	PIM
Stuart Skinner	12	12	618:57	5	6	38	3.68	325	.883	0	0	0	2
Jack Campbell	4	0	118:16	1	0	2	1.01	51	.961	0	0	0	0

^{†}Denotes player spent time with another team before joining the Oilers. Stats reflect time with the Oilers only.
^{‡}Denotes player was traded mid-season. Stats reflect time with the Oilers only.

== Awards and honours ==
=== Awards ===
Player	Award	Awarded	Ref.
Connor McDavid	NHL 2nd Star of the Week (Oct. 9 – Oct. 16)	October 17, 2022	
Connor McDavid	NHL 1st Star of the Week (Oct. 23 – Oct. 30)	October 31, 2022	
Connor McDavid	NHL 1st Star of the Month (October)	November 1, 2022	
Connor McDavid	NHL 1st Star of the Week (Nov. 27 – Dec. 4)	December 5, 2022	
Connor McDavid	NHL All-Star game selection	January 5, 2023	
Leon Draisaitl	NHL All-Star game selection	January 19, 2023	
Stuart Skinner	NHL All-Star game selection	January 19, 2023	
Zach Hyman	NHL 1st Star of the Week (Jan. 15 – Jan. 22)	January 23, 2023	
Connor McDavid	NHL 1st Star of the Week (Feb. 19 – Feb. 26)	February 27, 2022	
Connor McDavid	NHL 1st Star of the Month (February)	March 1, 2023	
Connor McDavid	NHL 1st Star of the Month (March)	April 1, 2023	
Leon Draisaitl	NHL 2nd Star of the Month (March)	April 1, 2023	
Stuart Skinner	NHL Rookie of the Month (March)	April 1, 2023	

=== Milestones ===
Regular season
Player	Milestone	Reached
Connor McDavid	700th NHL point 11th NHL hat-trick	October 12, 2022
Ryan Nugent-Hopkins	200th NHL goal	October 26, 2022
Connor McDavid	12th NHL hat-trick	October 27, 2022
Evander Kane	5th NHL hat-trick	November 1, 2022
Darnell Nurse	200th NHL point	November 5, 2022
Jesse Puljujarvi	100th NHL point	November 5, 2022
Connor McDavid	500th NHL game	November 7, 2022
Tyson Barrie	700th NHL game	November 16, 2022
Darnell Nurse	500th NHL game	November 30, 2022
Zach Hyman	1st NHL hat-trick	December 13, 2022
Tyson Barrie	100th NHL goal	December 27, 2022
Connor McDavid	500th NHL assist	January 5, 2023
Leon Draisaitl	400th NHL assist	January 5, 2023
Leon Draisaitl	600th NHL game	January 13, 2023
Matt Berlin	1st NHL game	January 28, 2023
Zach Hyman	300th NHL point	February 11, 2023
Leon Draisaitl	700th NHL point	February 21, 2023
Connor McDavid	800th NHL point	February 21, 2023
Ryan Nugent-Hopkins	600th NHL point	February 23, 2023
Leon Draisaitl	7th NHL hat-trick	March 4, 2023
Nick Bjugstad	600th NHL game	March 4, 2023
Evander Kane	6th NHL hat-trick	March 18, 2023
Cody Ceci	700th NHL game	March 25, 2023
Leon Draisaitl	300th NHL goal	March 27, 2023
Evander Kane	300th NHL goal	March 28, 2023
Connor McDavid	300th NHL goal	March 30, 2023
Stuart Skinner	2nd NHL shutout	March 30, 2023
Leon Draisaitl	8th NHL hat-trick	April 1, 2023
Jack Campbell	10th NHL shutout	April 1, 2023
Jason Demers	700th NHL game	April 8, 2023
Ryan Nugent-Hopkins	800th NHL game	April 11, 2023
Zach Hyman	500th NHL game	April 13, 2023
Derek Ryan	500th NHL game	April 13, 2023

Playoffs
Player	Milestone	Reached
Vincent Desharnais	1st NHL playoff game	April 17, 2023
Klim Kostin	1st NHL playoff game	April 17, 2023
Stuart Skinner	1st NHL playoff game	April 17, 2023
Klim Kostin	1st NHL playoff goal 1st NHL playoff point	April 19, 2023
Stuart Skinner	1st NHL playoff win	April 19, 2023
Vincent Desharnais	1st NHL playoff assist 1st NHL playoff point	April 29, 2023
Klim Kostin	1st NHL playoff assist	April 29, 2023
Leon Draisaitl	2nd NHL playoff hat-trick	May 3, 2023

== Transactions ==
The Oilers have been involved in the following transactions during the 2022–23 season.

Key:

† Contract is entry-level.
‡ Contract initially takes effect in the 2023–24 season.

=== Trades ===
Date	Details		Ref
July 12, 2022	To Arizona Coyotes Zack Kassian; 1st-round pick in 2022; 3rd round pick in 2024; 2nd-round pick in 2025	To Edmonton Oilers 1st-round pick in 2022	
October 9, 2022	To St. Louis Blues Dmitri Samorukov	To Edmonton Oilers Klim Kostin	
February 28, 2023	To Carolina Hurricanes Jesse Puljujarvi	To Edmonton Oilers Patrik Puistola	
February 28, 2023	To Nashville Predators Tyson Barrie; Reid Schaefer; 1st-round pick in 2023; 4th-round pick in 2024	To Edmonton Oilers Mattias Ekholm; 6th-round pick in 2024	
March 2, 2023	To Arizona Coyotes Michael Kesselring; 3rd-round pick in 2023	To Edmonton Oilers Nick Bjugstad; Cam Dineen	
May 31, 2023	To New York Rangers 5th-round pick in 2023	To Edmonton Oilers Jayden Grubbe	
June 29, 2023	To Detroit Red Wings Klim Kostin; Kailer Yamamoto	To Edmonton Oilers Future considerations	

=== Players acquired ===
Date	Player	Former team	Term	Via	Ref
July 13, 2022	Jack Campbell	Toronto Maple Leafs	5-year	Free agency	
July 13, 2022	Greg McKegg	New York Rangers	2-year	Free agency	
July 13, 2022	Calvin Pickard	Detroit Red Wings	2-year	Free agency	
July 17, 2022	Mattias Janmark	Vegas Golden Knights	1-year	Free agency	
September 2, 2022	Ryan Murray	Colorado Avalanche	1-year	Free agency	
December 18, 2022	Jason Demers	Bakersfield Condors (AHL)	1-year	Free agency	
January 6, 2023	Justin Bailey	Bakersfield Condors (AHL)	1-year	Free agency	
March 22, 2023	Carl Berglund	UMass-Lowell Riverhawks (HE)	2-year†‡	Free agency	

=== Players lost ===
Date	Player	New team	Term	Via	Ref
July 12, 2022	Duncan Keith			Retirement	
July 13, 2022	Josh Archibald	Pittsburgh Penguins	1-year	Free agency	
July 13, 2022	Cooper Marody	Philadelphia Flyers	2-year	Free agency	
August 15, 2022	Colton Sceviour	SC Bern (NL)	1-year	Free agency	
August 18, 2022	Kyle Turris			Retirement	
October 10, 2022	Derick Brassard	Ottawa Senators	1-year	Free agency	
June 14, 2023	Noah Philp			Retirement	

=== Signings ===
Date	Player	Term	Ref
July 13, 2022	Evander Kane	4-year	
July 13, 2022	Brett Kulak	4-year	
July 15, 2022	Reid Schaefer	3-year†	
July 26, 2022	Jesse Puljujarvi	1-year	
August 3, 2022	Kailer Yamamoto	2-year	
August 6, 2022	Tyler Benson	1-year	
September 22, 2022	Ryan McLeod	1-year	
September 30, 2022	Maximus Wanner	3-year†	
December 19, 2022	Stuart Skinner	3-year‡	
March 18, 2023	Jake Chiasson	3-year†‡	
April 16, 2023	Cam Dineen	1-year‡	
May 30, 2023	Phil Kemp	2-year‡	
May 31, 2023	Jayden Grubbe	3-year†‡	
June 13, 2023	Derek Ryan	2-year‡	
June 30, 2023	Mattias Janmark	1-year‡	

== Draft picks ==
Below are the Edmonton Oilers' selections at the 2022 NHL entry draft, which were held on July 7 to 8, 2022. It was held at the Bell Centre in Montreal, Quebec.

Round	#	Player	Pos	Nationality	College/Junior/Club team (League)
1	32	Reid Schaefer	F	Canada	Seattle Thunderbirds (WHL)
5	158	Samuel Jonsson	G	Sweden	Brynäs IF (J20 Nationell)
6	190	Nikita Yevseyev	D	Russia	Bars Kazan (VHL)
7	222	Joel Maatta	C	Finland	Vermont Catamounts (HE)
