= 2022–23 New York Islanders season =

National Hockey League season

2022–23 New York Islanders
- Division: 4th Metropolitan
- Conference: 7th Eastern
- 2022–23 record: 42–31–9
- Home record: 25–13–3
- Road record: 17–18–6
- Goals for: 243
- Goals against: 222

Team information
- General manager: Lou Lamoriello
- Coach: Lane Lambert
- Captain: Anders Lee
- Alternate captains: Josh Bailey; Cal Clutterbuck
- Arena: UBS Arena
- Average attendance: 16,912
- Minor league affiliates: Bridgeport Islanders (AHL); Worcester Railers (ECHL)

Team leaders
- Goals: Brock Nelson (36)
- Assists: Brock Nelson (39)
- Points: Brock Nelson (75)
- Penalty minutes: Scott Mayfield (83)
- Plus/minus: Adam Pelech (+15)
- Wins: Ilya Sorokin (31)
- Goals against average: Ilya Sorokin (2.34)

The 2022–23 New York Islanders season was the 51st season in the franchise's history. It was their second season in UBS Arena.

Lane Lambert was promoted to head coach on May 16, 2022, after Barry Trotz was fired at the end of the 2021–22 season.

The Islanders clinched a playoff berth on April 12, 2023, after defeating the Montreal Canadiens. The Islanders lost to the Carolina Hurricanes in the first round in six games. During game 3 against the Hurricanes, the Islanders set a record for the fastest consecutive four goals in Stanley Cup playoffs history, at 2 minutes and 18 seconds.

== Standings ==
=== Divisional standings ===
Metropolitan Division
Pos	Team	GP	W	L	OTL	RW	GF	GA	GD	Pts
1	y – Carolina Hurricanes	82	52	21	9	39	266	213	+53	113
2	x – New Jersey Devils	82	52	22	8	39	291	226	+65	112
3	x – New York Rangers	82	47	22	13	37	277	219	+58	107
4	x – New York Islanders	82	42	31	9	36	243	222	+21	93
5	Pittsburgh Penguins	82	40	31	11	31	262	264	−2	91
6	Washington Capitals	82	35	37	10	27	255	265	−10	80
7	Philadelphia Flyers	82	31	38	13	26	222	277	−55	75
8	Columbus Blue Jackets	82	25	48	9	15	214	330	−116	59

Source: National Hockey League
Rules for classification: 1) Fewer number of games played (GP, only during regular season); 2) Greater number of regulation wins (RW); 3) Greater number of wins in regulation and overtime, excluding shootout wins (ROW); 4) Greater number of total wins, including shootouts (W); 5) Greater number of points earned in head-to-head play; if teams played an uneven number of head-to-head games, the result of the first game on the home ice of the team with the extra home game is discarded; 6) Greater goal differential (GD); 7) Greater number of goals scored (GF)
x – Clinched playoff spot; y – Clinched division

=== Conference standings ===
Eastern Conference Wild Card
Pos	Div	Team	GP	W	L	OTL	RW	GF	GA	GD	Pts
1	ME	x – New York Islanders	82	42	31	9	36	243	222	+21	93
2	AT	x – Florida Panthers	82	42	32	8	36	290	273	+17	92
3	ME	Pittsburgh Penguins	82	40	31	11	31	262	264	−2	91
4	AT	Buffalo Sabres	82	42	33	7	30	296	300	−4	91
5	AT	Ottawa Senators	82	39	35	8	31	261	271	−10	86
6	AT	Detroit Red Wings	82	35	37	10	28	240	279	−39	80
7	ME	Washington Capitals	82	35	37	10	27	255	265	−10	80
8	ME	Philadelphia Flyers	82	31	38	13	26	222	277	−55	75
9	AT	Montreal Canadiens	82	31	45	6	21	232	307	−75	68
10	ME	Columbus Blue Jackets	82	25	48	9	15	214	330	−116	59

Source: National Hockey League
Rules for classification: 1) Fewer number of games played (GP, only during regular season); 2) Greater number of regulation wins (RW); 3) Greater number of wins in regulation and overtime, excluding shootout wins (ROW); 4) Greater number of total wins, including shootouts (W); 5) Greater number of points earned in head-to-head play; if teams played an uneven number of head-to-head games, the result of the first game on the home ice of the team with the extra home game is discarded; 6) Greater goal differential (GD); 7) Greater number of goals scored (GF)
x – Clinched playoff spot

== Schedule and results ==
=== Preseason ===
The preseason schedule was published on June 28, 2022.

2022 preseason game log: 4–2–0 (home: 3–0–0; road: 1–2–0)
#	Date	Visitor	Score	Home	OT	Decision	Attendance	Record	Recap
1	September 26	NY Islanders	1–4	NY Rangers		Varlamov	14,776	0–1–0
2	September 27	NY Islanders	1–4	New Jersey		Sorokin	5,526	0–2–0
3	October 2	Philadelphia	1–2	NY Islanders		Varlamov	—	1–2–0
4	October 4	NY Islanders	4–3	Philadelphia	OT	Sorokin	19,903	2–2–0
5	October 6	New Jersey	2–5	NY Islanders		Varlamov	7,512	3–2–0
6	October 8	NY Rangers	1–3	NY Islanders		Sorokin	14,569	4–2–0

=== Regular season ===
The regular season schedule was published on July 6, 2022.

2022–23 game log

October: 5–4–0 (home: 4–2–0; road: 1–2–0)
#	Date	Visitor	Score	Home	OT	Decision	Attendance	Record	Pts	Recap
1	October 13	Florida	3–1	NY Islanders		Sorokin	17,255	0–1–0	0
2	October 15	Anaheim	1–7	NY Islanders		Sorokin	16,487	1–1–0	2
3	October 18	San Jose	2–5	NY Islanders		Varlamov	13,892	2–1–0	4
4	October 20	New Jersey	4–1	NY Islanders		Sorokin	16,046	2–2–0	4
5	October 22	NY Islanders	3–5	Tampa Bay		Sorokin	19,092	2–3–0	4
6	October 23	NY Islanders	2–3	Florida		Varlamov	16,342	2–4–0	4
7	October 26	NY Rangers	0–3	NY Islanders		Sorokin	17,255	3–4–0	6
8	October 28	NY Islanders	6–2	Carolina		Sorokin	18,680	4–4–0	8
9	October 29	Colorado	4–5	NY Islanders		Varlamov	17,255	5–4–0	10

November: 10–5–0 (home: 4–1–0; road: 6–4–0)
#	Date	Visitor	Score	Home	OT	Decision	Attendance	Record	Pts	Recap
10	November 1	NY Islanders	3–1	Chicago		Sorokin	12,523	6–4–0	12
11	November 3	NY Islanders	5–2	St. Louis		Sorokin	18,096	7–4–0	14
12	November 5	NY Islanders	0–3	Detroit		Sorokin	19,515	7–5–0	14
13	November 7	Calgary	3–4	NY Islanders	OT	Sorokin	15,722	8–5–0	16
14	November 8	NY Islanders	4–3	NY Rangers		Varlamov	18,006	9–5–0	18
15	November 10	Arizona	2–0	NY Islanders		Sorokin	17,255	9–6–0	18
16	November 12	Columbus	3–4	NY Islanders	OT	Sorokin	17,255	10–6–0	20
17	November 14	NY Islanders	4–2	Ottawa		Varlamov	13,408	11–6–0	22
18	November 17	NY Islanders	4–5	Nashville		Sorokin	17,159	11–7–0	22
19	November 19	NY Islanders	2–5	Dallas		Varlamov	18,532	11–8–0	22
20	November 21	NY Islanders	3–2	Toronto	OT	Sorokin	18,494	12–8–0	24
21	November 23	Edmonton	0–3	NY Islanders		Sorokin	17,255	13–8–0	26
22	November 25	NY Islanders	3–2	Columbus		Sorokin	17,286	14–8–0	28
23	November 26	Philadelphia	2–5	NY Islanders		Varlamov	17,255	15–8–0	30
24	November 29	NY Islanders	1–3	Philadelphia		Sorokin	18,143	15–9–0	30

December: 6–5–2 (home: 4–3–0; road: 2–2–2)
#	Date	Visitor	Score	Home	OT	Decision	Attendance	Record	Pts	Recap
25	December 2	Nashville	4–1	NY Islanders		Sorokin	16,263	15–10–0	30
26	December 4	Chicago	0–3	NY Islanders		Varlamov	16,124	16–10–0	32
27	December 6	St. Louis	7–4	NY Islanders		Sorokin	16,044	16–11–0	32
28	December 9	NY Islanders	6–4	New Jersey		Varlamov	16,514	17–11–0	34
29	December 10	Carolina	3–0	NY Islanders		Sorokin	17,255	17–12–0	34
30	December 13	NY Islanders	3–4	Boston	SO	Varlamov	17,850	17–12–1	35
31	December 16	NY Islanders	4–5	Arizona		Sorokin	4,600	17–13–1	35
32	December 17	NY Islanders	5–2	Vegas		Varlamov	18,007	18–13–1	37
33	December 19	NY Islanders	0–1	Colorado	SO	Sorokin	18,110	18–13–2	38
34	December 22	NY Islanders	3–5	NY Rangers		Sorokin	18,006	18–14–2	38
35	December 23	Florida	1–5	NY Islanders		Sorokin	17,255	19–14–2	40
36	December 27	Pittsburgh	1–5	NY Islanders		Sorokin	17,255	20–14–2	42
37	December 29	Columbus	1–2	NY Islanders		Sorokin	17,255	21–14–2	44

January: 4–8–3 (home: 3–3–2; road: 1–5–1)
#	Date	Visitor	Score	Home	OT	Decision	Attendance	Record	Pts	Recap
38	January 1	NY Islanders	1–4	Seattle		Sorokin	17,151	21–15–2	44
39	January 3	NY Islanders	6–2	Vancouver		Sorokin	18,912	22–15–2	46
40	January 5	NY Islanders	2–4	Edmonton		Sorokin	17,755	22–16–2	46
41	January 6	NY Islanders	1–4	Calgary		Varlamov	18,837	22–17–2	46
42	January 10	Dallas	2–1	NY Islanders	SO	Sorokin	16,412	22–17–3	47
43	January 12	Minnesota	3–1	NY Islanders		Sorokin	17,255	22–18–3	47
44	January 14	Montreal	1–2	NY Islanders		Sorokin	17,255	23–18–3	49
45	January 16	Washington	4–3	NY Islanders	OT	Sorokin	16,344	23–18–4	50
46	January 18	Boston	4–1	NY Islanders		Varlamov	17,255	23–19–4	50
47	January 19	NY Islanders	2–3	Buffalo	OT	Sorokin	19,070	23–19–5	51
48	January 21	Carolina	5–2	NY Islanders		Sorokin	17,255	23–20–5	51
49	January 23	NY Islanders	2–5	Toronto		Sorokin	18,514	23–21–5	51
50	January 25	NY Islanders	1–2	Ottawa		Varlamov	13,980	23–22–5	51
51	January 27	Detroit	0–2	NY Islanders		Sorokin	17,255	24–22–5	53
52	January 28	Vegas	1–2	NY Islanders	OT	Varlamov	17,255	25–22–5	55

February: 6–3–3 (home: 3–2–1; road: 3–1–2)
#	Date	Visitor	Score	Home	OT	Decision	Attendance	Record	Pts	Recap
53	February 6	NY Islanders	2–1	Philadelphia		Varlamov	18,695	26–22–5	57
54	February 7	Seattle	0–4	NY Islanders		Sorokin	17,255	27–22–5	59
55	February 9	Vancouver	6–5	NY Islanders		Sorokin	17,255	27–23–5	59
56	February 11	NY Islanders	3–4	Montreal	OT	Varlamov	21,105	27–23–6	60
57	February 14	Ottawa	3–2	NY Islanders	SO	Sorokin	15,134	27–23–7	61
58	February 17	Pittsburgh	4–5	NY Islanders		Sorokin	17,255	28–23–7	63
59	February 18	NY Islanders	2–6	Boston		Varlamov	17,850	28–24–7	63
60	February 20	NY Islanders	4–2	Pittsburgh		Sorokin	18,094	29–24–7	65
61	February 22	Winnipeg	1–2	NY Islanders		Sorokin	17,255	30–24–7	67
62	February 24	Los Angeles	3–2	NY Islanders		Sorokin	17,255	30–25–7	67
63	February 26	NY Islanders	4–0	Winnipeg		Varlamov	13,797	31–25–7	69
64	February 28	NY Islanders	1–2	Minnesota	SO	Sorokin	18,431	31–25–8	70

March: 8–3–1 (home: 4–2–0; road: 4–1–1)
#	Date	Visitor	Score	Home	OT	Decision	Attendance	Record	Pts	Recap
65	March 4	Detroit	1–4	NY Islanders		Sorokin	17,255	32–25–8	72
66	March 7	Buffalo	2–3	NY Islanders		Sorokin	17,255	33–25–8	74
67	March 9	NY Islanders	4–3	Pittsburgh	OT	Sorokin	17,557	34–25–8	76
68	March 11	Washington	5–1	NY Islanders		Varlamov	17,255	34–26–8	76
69	March 14	NY Islanders	2–5	Los Angeles		Sorokin	15,989	34–27–8	76
70	March 15	NY Islanders	6–3	Anaheim		Sorokin	13,552	35–27–8	78
71	March 18	NY Islanders	4–1	San Jose		Sorokin	16,880	36–27–8	80
72	March 21	Toronto	2–7	NY Islanders		Sorokin	17,255	37–27–8	82
73	March 24	NY Islanders	4–5	Columbus	OT	Sorokin	18,940	37–27–9	83
74	March 25	Buffalo	2–0	NY Islanders		Varlamov	17,255	37–28–9	83
75	March 27	New Jersey	1–5	NY Islanders		Sorokin	17,255	38–28–9	85
76	March 29	NY Islanders	2–1	Washington	SO	Sorokin	18,573	39–28–9	87

April: 3–3–0 (home: 3–0–0; road: 0–3–0)
#	Date	Visitor	Score	Home	OT	Decision	Attendance	Record	Pts	Recap
77	April 1	NY Islanders	0–5	Tampa Bay		Sorokin	19,092	39–29–9	87
78	April 2	NY Islanders	1–2	Carolina		Sorokin	18,725	39–30–9	87
79	April 6	Tampa Bay	1–6	NY Islanders		Sorokin	17,255	40–30–9	89
80	April 8	Philadelphia	0–4	NY Islanders		Sorokin	17,255	41–30–9	91
81	April 10	NY Islanders	2–5	Washington		Sorokin	18,573	41–31–9	91
82	April 12	Montreal	2–4	NY Islanders		Sorokin	17,255	42–31–9	93

Legend: Win (2 points) Loss (0 points) Overtime/shootout loss (1 point)

=== Playoffs ===
The Islanders faced the Carolina Hurricanes in the first round, losing the series in six games.

2023 Stanley Cup playoffs

Eastern Conference first round vs. (M1) Carolina Hurricanes: Carolina won 4–2
#	Date	Visitor	Score	Home	OT	Decision	Attendance	Series	Recap
1	April 17	NY Islanders	1–2	Carolina		Sorokin	18,680	0–1
2	April 19	NY Islanders	3–4	Carolina	OT	Sorokin	18,680	0–2
3	April 21	Carolina	1–5	NY Islanders		Sorokin	17,255	1–2
4	April 23	Carolina	5–2	NY Islanders		Sorokin	17,255	1–3
5	April 25	NY Islanders	3–2	Carolina		Sorokin	18,680	2–3
6	April 28	Carolina	2–1	NY Islanders	OT	Sorokin	17,255	2–4

Legend: Win Loss

== Player statistics ==
As of April 28, 2023

=== Skaters ===
Regular season
Player	GP	G	A	Pts	+/−	PIM
Brock Nelson	82	36	39	75	+13	24
Mathew Barzal	58	14	37	51	+5	22
Anders Lee	82	28	22	50	–3	50
Noah Dobson	78	13	36	49	+4	20
Jean-Gabriel Pageau	70	13	27	40	–2	14
Zach Parise	82	21	13	34	+7	24
Kyle Palmieri	55	16	17	33	+13	24
Ryan Pulock	82	5	21	26	+10	14
Josh Bailey	64	8	17	25	+3	2
Scott Mayfield	82	6	18	24	+8	83
Sebastian Aho	71	5	18	23	+9	22
Alexander Romanov	76	2	20	22	+13	43
Adam Pelech	61	6	15	21	+15	36
Casey Cizikas	81	6	15	21	0	54
Anthony Beauvillier^{‡}	49	9	11	20	–4	10
Hudson Fasching	49	10	9	19	+10	10
Matt Martin	81	7	12	19	+4	63
Oliver Wahlstrom	35	7	9	16	+5	32
Bo Horvat^{†}	30	7	9	16	–4	6
Cal Clutterbuck	49	6	6	12	+9	30
Simon Holmström	50	6	3	9	–4	0
Pierre Engvall^{†}	18	5	4	9	+7	6
Robin Salo	11	2	2	4	+1	4
Samuel Bolduc	17	2	1	3	+5	2
Aatu Räty^{‡}	12	2	0	2	+1	4
Otto Koivula	8	0	2	2	+1	4
Ross Johnston	16	0	2	2	–1	37
Parker Wotherspoon	12	0	1	1	+5	4
Andy Andreoff	3	0	1	1	–3	0
William Dufour	1	0	0	0	–2	0
Arnaud Durandeau	4	0	0	0	+1	2
Dennis Cholowski	2	0	0	0	–1	0
Kieffer Bellows	1	0	0	0	–1	0
Nikita Soshnikov	3	0	0	0	–2	0
Cole Bardreau	1	0	0	0	0	2

Playoffs
Player	GP	G	A	Pts	+/−	PIM
Brock Nelson	6	2	3	5	+4	4
Kyle Palmieri	6	2	3	5	+4	4
Ryan Pulock	6	1	3	4	0	6
Scott Mayfield	6	1	2	3	+1	2
Casey Cizikas	6	1	2	3	–2	16
Mathew Barzal	6	2	0	2	–1	2
Pierre Engvall	6	1	1	2	+4	0
Bo Horvat	6	1	1	2	+2	0
Adam Pelech	6	1	1	2	+1	2
Noah Dobson	6	0	2	2	+2	2
Anders Lee	6	1	0	1	0	12
Matt Martin	6	1	0	1	0	16
Cal Clutterbuck	6	1	0	1	–1	16
Sebastian Aho	6	0	1	1	0	2
Jean-Gabriel Pageau	6	0	1	1	–1	0
Samuel Bolduc	2	0	0	0	0	4
Alexander Romanov	4	0	0	0	+3	2
Hudson Fasching	6	0	0	0	–1	2
Zach Parise	6	0	0	0	–2	2

=== Goaltenders ===
Regular season
Player	GP	GS	TOI	W	L	OT	GA	GAA	SA	SV%	SO	G	A	PIM
Ilya Sorokin	62	60	3,587:04	31	22	7	140	2.34	1,838	.924	6	0	1	0
Semyon Varlamov	23	22	1,334:44	11	9	2	60	2.70	689	.913	2	0	0	0

Playoffs
Player	GP	GS	TOI	W	L	GA	GAA	SA	SV%	SO	G	A	PIM
Ilya Sorokin	6	6	369:27	2	4	16	2.60	210	.929	0	0	0	0

- ^{†} Denotes player spent time with another team before joining the Islanders. Stats reflect time with the Islanders only.
- ^{‡} Denotes player was traded mid-season. Stats reflect time with the Islanders only.
- Bold/italics denotes franchise record.

== Transactions ==
The Islanders have been involved in the following transactions during the 2022–23 season.

=== Trades ===
Date	Details		Ref
July 7, 2022	To Montreal Canadiens 1st-round pick in 2022	To New York Islanders Alexander Romanov; 4th-round pick in 2022	
January 30, 2023	To Vancouver Canucks Anthony Beauvillier; Aatu Räty; Conditional 1st-round pick in 2023	To New York Islanders Bo Horvat	
February 28, 2023	To Toronto Maple Leafs 3rd-round pick in 2024	To New York Islanders Pierre Engvall	

=== Free agents ===
Date	Player	Team	Contract term	Ref
July 13, 2022	Austin Czarnik	to Detroit Red Wings	2-year	
July 13, 2022	Jeff Kubiak	from Bridgeport Islanders (AHL)	1-year	
July 21, 2022	Mitchell Vande Sompel	to Colorado Eagles (AHL)	1-year	
August 23, 2022	Dennis Cholowski	from Seattle Kraken	2-year	
August 23, 2022	Hudson Fasching	from Arizona Coyotes	1-year	
September 21, 2022	Nikita Soshnikov	from Avangard Omsk (KHL)	1-year	
October 12, 2022	Richard Pánik	to Lausanne HC (NL)	1-year	
October 13, 2022	Michael Dal Colle	to HC TPS (Liiga)	1-year	
March 31, 2023	Aidan Fulp	from Western Michigan Broncos (NCHC)	2-year	
March 31, 2023	Travis Mitchell	from Cornell Big Red (ECAC)	2-year	
May 19, 2023	Kyle MacLean	from Bridgeport Islanders (AHL)	1-year	

=== Waivers ===
Date	Player	Team	Ref
October 27, 2022	Kieffer Bellows	to Philadelphia Flyers	

=== Contract terminations ===
Date	Player	Via	Ref
December 19, 2022	Nikita Soshnikov	Mutual termination	

=== Retirement ===
Date	Player	Ref
September 20, 2022	Zdeno Chára	
October 12, 2022	Andy Greene	

=== Signings ===
Date	Player	Contract term	Ref
August 22, 2022	Kieffer Bellows	1-year	
August 22, 2022	Noah Dobson	3-year	
August 22, 2022	Alexander Romanov	3-year	
August 23, 2022	Arnaud Durandeau	2-year	
August 23, 2022	Paul LaDue	2-year	
August 31, 2022	Calle Odelius	3-year	
September 21, 2022	Cory Schneider	1-year	
September 21, 2022	Parker Wotherspoon	1-year	
October 4, 2022	Mathew Barzal	8-year	
February 5, 2023	Bo Horvat	8-year	
March 1, 2023	Tristan Lennox	3-year	
May 1, 2023	Hudson Fasching	2-year	
May 1, 2023	Matthew Maggio	3-year	
May 19, 2023	Daylan Kuefler	3-year	
June 7, 2023	Eetu Liukas	3-year	
June 20, 2023	Samuel Bolduc	2-year	

== Draft picks ==
Below are the New York Islanders' selections at the 2022 NHL entry draft, which was held on July 7 and 8, 2022, at Bell Centre in Montreal.

Round	#	Player	Pos	Nationality	College/junior/club team
2	65^{1}	Calle Odelius	D	Sweden	Djurgårdens IF (HockeyAllsvenskan)
3	78	Quinn Finley	LW	United States	Madison Capitols (USHL)
4	98^{2}	Isaiah George	D	Canada	London Knights (OHL)
5	142	Matthew Maggio	RW	Canada	Windsor Spitfires (OHL)
6	174	Daylan Kuefler	LW	Canada	Kamloops Blazers (WHL)

1. The Colorado Avalanche's second-round pick went to the New York Islanders as the result of a trade on October 12, 2020, that sent Devon Toews to Colorado in exchange for a second-round pick in 2021 and this pick.
2. The Montreal Canadiens' fourth-round pick went to the New York Islanders as the result of a trade on July 7, 2022, that sent first-round pick in 2022 to Montreal in exchange for Alexander Romanov and this pick.
