= 2022–23 Calgary Flames season =

National Hockey League season

2022–23 Calgary Flames
- Division: 5th Pacific
- Conference: 9th Western
- 2022–23 record: 38–27–17
- Home record: 20–16–5
- Road record: 18–11–12
- Goals for: 260
- Goals against: 252

Team information
- General manager: Brad Treliving
- Coach: Darryl Sutter
- Captain: Vacant
- Alternate captains: Mikael Backlund; Jonathan Huberdeau; Elias Lindholm; Christopher Tanev
- Arena: Scotiabank Saddledome
- Average attendance: 17,956
- Minor league affiliates: Calgary Wranglers (AHL); Rapid City Rush (ECHL)

Team leaders
- Goals: Tyler Toffoli (34)
- Assists: Elias Lindholm (42)
- Points: Tyler Toffoli (73)
- Penalty minutes: Nikita Zadorov (80)
- Plus/minus: Mikael Backlund (+24)
- Wins: Jacob Markstrom (23)
- Goals against average: Dustin Wolf (1.00)

The 2022–23 Calgary Flames season was the Flames' 43rd season in Calgary, and the 51st season for the Flames' National Hockey League franchise that was established on June 6, 1972. The opening game was held on October 13, 2022, against Colorado. The Flames were eliminated from playoff contention on April 10, 2023, after losing to the Nashville Predators in a shootout.

== Standings ==
=== Divisional standings ===
Pacific Division
Pos	Team	GP	W	L	OTL	RW	GF	GA	GD	Pts
1	z – Vegas Golden Knights	82	51	22	9	38	272	229	+43	111
2	x – Edmonton Oilers	82	50	23	9	45	325	260	+65	109
3	x – Los Angeles Kings	82	47	25	10	37	280	257	+23	104
4	x – Seattle Kraken	82	46	28	8	37	289	256	+33	100
5	Calgary Flames	82	38	27	17	31	260	252	+8	93
6	Vancouver Canucks	82	38	37	7	24	276	298	−22	83
7	San Jose Sharks	82	22	44	16	16	234	321	−87	60
8	Anaheim Ducks	82	23	47	12	13	209	338	−129	58

Source: National Hockey League
Rules for classification: 1) Fewer number of games played (GP, only during regular season); 2) Greater number of regulation wins (RW); 3) Greater number of wins in regulation and overtime, excluding shootout wins (ROW); 4) Greater number of total wins, including shootouts (W); 5) Greater number of points earned in head-to-head play; if teams played an uneven number of head-to-head games, the result of the first game on the home ice of the team with the extra home game is discarded; 6) Greater goal differential (GD); 7) Greater number of goals scored (GF)
x – Clinched playoff spot; z – Clinched conference

=== Conference standings ===
Western Conference Wild Card
Pos	Div	Team	GP	W	L	OTL	RW	GF	GA	GD	Pts
1	PA	x – Seattle Kraken	82	46	28	8	37	289	256	+33	100
2	CE	x – Winnipeg Jets	82	46	33	3	36	247	225	+22	95
3	PA	Calgary Flames	82	38	27	17	31	260	252	+8	93
4	CE	Nashville Predators	82	42	32	8	29	229	238	−9	92
5	PA	Vancouver Canucks	82	38	37	7	24	276	298	−22	83
6	CE	St. Louis Blues	82	37	38	7	27	263	301	−38	81
7	CE	Arizona Coyotes	82	28	40	14	20	228	299	−71	70
8	PA	San Jose Sharks	82	22	44	16	16	234	321	−87	60
9	CE	Chicago Blackhawks	82	26	49	7	18	204	301	−97	59
10	PA	Anaheim Ducks	82	23	47	12	13	209	338	−129	58

Source: National Hockey League
Rules for classification: 1) Fewer number of games played (GP, only during regular season); 2) Greater number of regulation wins (RW); 3) Greater number of wins in regulation and overtime, excluding shootout wins (ROW); 4) Greater number of total wins, including shootouts (W); 5) Greater number of points earned in head-to-head play; if teams played an uneven number of head-to-head games, the result of the first game on the home ice of the team with the extra home game is discarded; 6) Greater goal differential (GD); 7) Greater number of goals scored (GF)
x – Clinched playoff spot

== Schedule and results ==
=== Regular season ===
2022–23 game log

October: 5–2–0 (home: 4–2–0; road: 1–0–0)
#	Date	Visitor	Score	Home	OT	Decision	Attendance	Record	Pts	Recap
1	October 13	Colorado	3–5	Calgary		Markstrom	19,289	1–0–0	2
2	October 15	Calgary	4–3	Edmonton		Vladar	18,347	2–0–0	4
3	October 18	Vegas	2–3	Calgary		Markstrom	16,944	3–0–0	6
4	October 20	Buffalo	6–3	Calgary		Vladar	17,080	3–1–0	6
5	October 22	Carolina	2–3	Calgary	OT	Markstrom	17,210	4–1–0	8
6	October 25	Pittsburgh	1–4	Calgary		Markstrom	17,628	5–1–0	10
7	October 29	Edmonton	3–2	Calgary		Markstrom	19,289	5–2–0	10

November: 5–7–3 (home: 3–2–1; road: 2–5–2)
#	Date	Visitor	Score	Home	OT	Decision	Attendance	Record	Pts	Recap
8	November 1	Seattle	5–4	Calgary		Vladar	16,803	5–3–0	10
9	November 3	Nashville	4–1	Calgary		Markstrom	16,984	5–4–0	10
10	November 5	New Jersey	4–3	Calgary	OT	Markstrom	17,386	5–4–1	11
11	November 7	Calgary	3–4	NY Islanders	OT	Markstrom	15,722	5–4–2	12
12	November 8	Calgary	2–3	New Jersey		Markstrom	13,096	5–5–2	12
13	November 10	Calgary	1–3	Boston		Vladar	17,850	5–6–2	12
14	November 12	Winnipeg	2–3	Calgary		Markstrom	18,501	6–6–2	14
15	November 14	Los Angeles	5–6	Calgary		Markstrom	17,308	7–6–2	16
16	November 17	Calgary	1–4	Tampa Bay		Markstrom	19,092	7–7–2	16
17	November 19	Calgary	5–4	Florida	SO	Markstrom	15,842	8–7–2	18
18	November 21	Calgary	5–2	Philadelphia		Markstrom	17,896	9–7–2	20
19	November 23	Calgary	1–2	Pittsburgh	SO	Vladar	18,149	9–7–3	21
20	November 25	Calgary	0–3	Washington		Markstrom	18,573	9–8–3	21
21	November 26	Calgary	2–3	Carolina		Vladar	18,845	9–9–3	21
22	November 29	Florida	2–6	Calgary		Vladar	17,806	10–9–3	23

December: 8–4–4 (home: 4–3–1; road: 4–1–3)
#	Date	Visitor	Score	Home	OT	Decision	Attendance	Record	Pts	Recap
23	December 1	Montreal	2–1	Calgary		Markstrom	18,106	10–10–3	23
24	December 3	Washington	2–5	Calgary		Vladar	18,698	11–10–3	25
25	December 5	Arizona	2–3	Calgary		Vladar	16,899	12–10–3	27
26	December 7	Minnesota	3–5	Calgary		Vladar	17,562	13–10–3	29
27	December 9	Calgary	1–3	Columbus		Markstrom	16,902	13–11–3	29
28	December 10	Calgary	4–5	Toronto	OT	Vladar	18,857	13–11–4	30
29	December 12	Calgary	1–2	Montreal	SO	Markstrom	21,105	13–11–5	31
30	December 14	Vancouver	4–3	Calgary	SO	Markstrom	17,552	13–11–6	32
31	December 16	St. Louis	5–2	Calgary		Markstrom	18,001	13–12–6	32
32	December 18	Calgary	5–2	San Jose		Markstrom	14,207	14–12–6	34
33	December 20	Calgary	7–3	San Jose		Markstrom	10,431	15–12–6	36
34	December 22	Calgary	3–4	Los Angeles	OT	Vladar	16,731	15–12–7	37
35	December 23	Calgary	3–2	Anaheim	OT	Markstrom	16,094	16–12–7	39
36	December 27	Edmonton	2–1	Calgary		Markstrom	19,289	16–13–7	39
37	December 28	Calgary	3–2	Seattle		Vladar	17,151	17–13–7	41
38	December 31	Vancouver	2–3	Calgary		Markstrom	19,289	18–13–7	43

January: 6–4–2 (home: 3–2–0; road: 3–2–2)
#	Date	Visitor	Score	Home	OT	Decision	Attendance	Record	Pts	Recap
39	January 3	Calgary	2–3	Winnipeg		Markstrom	14,130	18–14–7	43
40	January 6	NY Islanders	1–4	Calgary		Markstrom	18,837	19–14–7	45
41	January 8	Calgary	3–4	Chicago	OT	Vladar	18,123	19–14–8	46
42	January 10	Calgary	3–4	St. Louis	OT	Markstrom	18,096	19–14–9	47
43	January 12	Calgary	4–1	St. Louis		Vladar	18,096	20–14–9	49
44	January 14	Calgary	6–5	Dallas		Vladar	18,532	21–14–9	51
45	January 16	Calgary	1–2	Nashville		Markstrom	17,159	21–15–9	51
46	January 18	Colorado	4–1	Calgary		Markstrom	17,768	21–16–9	51
47	January 21	Tampa Bay	3–6	Calgary		Vladar	18,831	22–16–9	53
48	January 23	Columbus	3–4	Calgary	OT	Vladar	17,697	23–16–9	55
49	January 26	Chicago	5–1	Calgary		Markstrom	17,659	23–17–9	55
50	January 27	Calgary	5–2	Seattle		Vladar	17,151	24–17–9	57

February: 3–4–4 (home: 1–2–1; road: 2–2–3)
#	Date	Visitor	Score	Home	OT	Decision	Attendance	Record	Pts	Recap
51	February 6	Calgary	4–5	NY Rangers	OT	Markstrom	17,173	24–17–10	58
52	February 9	Calgary	1–2	Detroit		Vladar	19,515	24–18–10	58
53	February 11	Calgary	7–2	Buffalo		Markstrom	18,356	25–18–10	60
54	February 13	Calgary	3–4	Ottawa	OT	Markstrom	15,024	25–18–11	61
55	February 16	Detroit	5–2	Calgary		Vladar	17,713	25–19–11	61
56	February 18	NY Rangers	2–3	Calgary	OT	Markstrom	19,206	26–19–11	63
57	February 20	Philadelphia	4–3	Calgary		Markstrom	19,036	26–20–11	63
58	February 22	Calgary	6–3	Arizona		Vladar	4,600	27–20–11	65
59	February 23	Calgary	3–4	Vegas	OT	Vladar	17,609	27–20–12	66
60	February 25	Calgary	1–4	Colorado		Markstrom	18,131	27–21–12	66
61	February 28	Boston	4–3	Calgary	OT	Markstrom	18,420	27–21–13	67

March: 8–5–2 (home: 3–4–1; road: 5–1–1)
#	Date	Visitor	Score	Home	OT	Decision	Attendance	Record	Pts	Recap
62	March 2	Toronto	2–1	Calgary		Markstrom	19,289	27–22–13	67
63	March 4	Minnesota	3–0	Calgary		Markstrom	18,605	27–23–13	67
64	March 6	Calgary	5–4	Dallas		Markstrom	18,164	28–23–13	69
65	March 7	Calgary	1–0	Minnesota	SO	Markstrom	18,998	29–23–13	71
66	March 10	Anaheim	3–1	Calgary		Markstrom	18,013	29–24–13	71
67	March 12	Ottawa	1–5	Calgary		Markstrom	17,031	30–24–13	73
68	March 14	Calgary	3–4	Arizona	OT	Markstrom	4,600	30–24–14	74
69	March 16	Calgary	7–2	Vegas		Markstrom	18,207	31–24–14	76
70	March 18	Dallas	6–5	Calgary	OT	Markstrom	17,909	31–24–15	77
71	March 20	Calgary	2–8	Los Angeles		Markstrom	16,404	31–25–15	77
72	March 21	Calgary	5–1	Anaheim		Vladar	12,974	32–25–15	79
73	March 23	Vegas	3–2	Calgary		Markstrom	18,157	32–26–15	79
74	March 25	San Jose	3–5	Calgary		Markstrom	18,153	33–26–15	81
75	March 28	Los Angeles	1–2	Calgary		Markstrom	17,106	34–26–15	83
76	March 31	Calgary	5–4	Vancouver	OT	Markstrom	18,811	35–26–15	85

April: 3–1–2 (home: 2–1–1; road: 1–0–1)
#	Date	Visitor	Score	Home	OT	Decision	Attendance	Record	Pts	Recap
77	April 2	Anaheim	4–5	Calgary		Vladar	17,439	36–26–15	87
78	April 4	Chicago	4–3	Calgary		Markstrom	17,137	36–27–15	87
79	April 5	Calgary	3–1	Winnipeg		Markstrom	14,077	37–27–15	89
80	April 8	Calgary	2–3	Vancouver	SO	Markstrom	18,852	37–27–16	90
81	April 10	Nashville	3–2	Calgary	SO	Markstrom	17,359	37–27–17	91
82	April 12	San Jose	1–3	Calgary		Wolf	17,211	38–27–17	93

Legend: Win (2 points) Loss (0 points) Overtime/shootout loss (1 point)

== Player statistics ==
=== Skaters ===
Regular season
Player	GP	G	A	Pts	+/−	PIM
Tyler Toffoli	82	34	39	73	+16	28
Elias Lindholm	80	22	42	64	+6	14
Nazem Kadri	82	24	32	56	−19	56
Mikael Backlund	82	19	37	56	+24	36
Jonathan Huberdeau	79	15	40	55	+2	36
Rasmus Andersson	79	11	38	49	+5	26
Dillon Dube	82	18	27	45	−6	47
Andrew Mangiapane	82	17	26	43	+12	40
Blake Coleman	82	18	20	38	+9	54
Noah Hanifin	81	7	31	38	+2	33
MacKenzie Weegar	81	4	27	31	+15	43
Nikita Zadorov	82	14	7	21	+10	80
Trevor Lewis	82	9	11	20	−7	18
Adam Ruzicka	44	6	14	20	−1	8
Milan Lucic	77	7	12	19	−13	43
Christopher Tanev	65	1	12	13	+7	21
Walker Duehr	27	7	4	11	0	4
Michael Stone	48	6	5	11	+2	35
Brett Ritchie^{‡}	34	6	2	8	+2	23
Jakob Pelletier	24	3	4	7	−5	2
Troy Stecher^{†}	20	3	4	7	−3	15
Nick Ritchie^{†}	16	4	1	5	−6	10
Dennis Gilbert	23	1	3	4	0	27
Connor Mackey^{‡}	10	2	1	3	−6	9
Kevin Rooney	17	0	1	1	−2	7
Matthew Coronato	1	0	0	0	+1	2
Radim Zohorna^{‡}	8	0	0	0	−2	0
Nick DeSimone	4	0	0	0	−4	2
Matthew Phillips	2	0	0	0	0	2

=== Goaltenders ===
Regular season
Player	GP	GS	TOI	W	L	OT	GA	GAA	SA	SV%	SO	G	A	PIM
Jacob Markstrom	59	58	3,410:50	23	21	12	166	2.92	1,542	.892	1	0	2	14
Daniel Vladar	27	23	1,483:55	14	6	5	72	2.91	667	.895	0	0	0	2
Dustin Wolf	1	1	59:54	1	0	0	1	1.00	24	.958	0	0	0	0

^{†}Denotes player spent time with another team before joining the Flames. Stats reflect time with the Flames only.
^{‡}Denotes player was traded mid-season. Stats reflect time with the Flames only.
Bold/italics denotes franchise record.

== Transactions ==
The Flames have been involved in the following transactions during the 2022–23 season.

Key:

† Contract is entry-level.
‡ Contract initially takes effect in the 2023–24 season.

=== Trades ===
Date	Details		Ref
July 22, 2022	To Florida Panthers Matthew Tkachuk; Conditional^{1} 4th-round pick in 2025	To Calgary Flames Jonathan Huberdeau; Cole Schwindt; MacKenzie Weegar; Conditional^{2} 1st-round pick in 2025	
August 18, 2022	To Montreal Canadiens Sean Monahan; Conditional^{3} 1st-round pick in 2024, 2025, or 2026; Conditional^{4} 3rd-round pick in 2025; Conditional^{5} 4th-round pick in 2025	To Calgary Flames Future considerations	
March 3, 2023	To Arizona Coyotes Connor Mackey; Brett Ritchie	To Calgary Flames Nick Ritchie; Troy Stecher	
March 3, 2023	To Toronto Maple Leafs Dryden Hunt	To Calgary Flames Radim Zohorna	
March 10, 2023	To Ottawa Senators Future considerations	To Calgary Flames Kristians Rubins	

Notes:

1. Florida will receive Calgary's 4th-round pick in 2026 instead if Florida's 1st-round pick in 2025 is within the top 2 selections.
2. Calgary will receive Florida's 1st-round pick in 2026 instead if Florida's 1st-round pick in 2025 is within the top 2 selections.
3. Montreal will have the option to receive Calgary's first-round pick in 2024 if the pick is outside of the top 20. If Montreal declines to exercise this option or Calgary's first-round pick in 2024 is within the top 20, they will receive one of Calgary or Florida's first-round picks in 2025 or 2026. If both Calgary and Florida's first-round picks in 2025 are outside of the top 10, Montreal will receive the earlier of the two. If Calgary's first-round pick in 2025 is in the top 10 and Florida's is outside, Montreal will receive Florida's first-round pick in 2025; if Florida's first-round pick in 2025 is in the top 10 and Calgary's outside, Montreal will receive Calgary's first-round pick in 2025. If both Calgary and Florida's first-round picks in 2025 are within the top 10, Montreal will receive Calgary's first-round pick, unless said pick is the first-overall selection in 2025; if it is, Montreal will instead receive the earlier of Calgary or Florida's first-round picks in 2026.
4. Montreal will receive Calgary's third-round pick in 2025 if Calgary's first-round pick in 2025 is the first-overall selection and Florida's first-round pick in 2025 is in the top 10 selections; otherwise no pick will be exchanged.
5. Montreal will receive Calgary's fourth-round pick in 2025 if both Calgary and Florida's first-round selections in 2025 are outside of the top 10, Florida's draft position is better than Calgary's, and the rights to Florida's first-round pick in 2025 are with another team; otherwise no pick will be exchanged.

=== Players acquired ===
Date	Player	Former team	Term	Via	Ref
July 13, 2022	Clark Bishop	Ottawa Senators	1-year	Free agency	
July 13, 2022	Oscar Dansk	Spartak Moscow (KHL)	1-year	Free agency	
July 13, 2022	Dennis Gilbert	Colorado Avalanche	2-year	Free agency	
July 13, 2022	Nicolas Meloche	San Jose Sharks	1-year	Free agency	
July 13, 2022	Kevin Rooney	New York Rangers	2-year	Free agency	
July 21, 2022	Ben Jones	Vegas Golden Knights	1-year	Free agency	
August 18, 2022	Nazem Kadri	Colorado Avalanche	7-year	Free agency	
October 3, 2022	Radim Zohorna	Pittsburgh Penguins		Waivers	

=== Players lost ===
Date	Player	New team	Term	Via	Ref
July 13, 2022	Byron Froese	Vegas Golden Knights	2-year	Free agency	
July 13, 2022	Johnny Gaudreau	Columbus Blue Jackets	7-year	Free agency	
July 13, 2022	Erik Gudbranson	Columbus Blue Jackets	4-year	Free agency	
July 13, 2022	Luke Philp	Chicago Blackhawks	1-year	Free agency	
July 14, 2022	Ryan Carpenter	New York Rangers	1-year	Free agency	
July 14, 2022	Glenn Gawdin	Anaheim Ducks	2-year	Free agency	
July 14, 2022	Kevin Gravel	Nashville Predators	2-year	Free agency	
July 14, 2022	Justin Kirkland	Anaheim Ducks	1-year	Free agency	
July 15, 2022	Calle Jarnkrok	Toronto Maple Leafs	4-year	Free agency	
July 18, 2022	Andy Welinski	New York Rangers	1-year	Free agency	
October 9, 2022	Juuso Valimaki	Arizona Coyotes		Waivers	

=== Signings ===
Date	Player	Term	Ref
July 13, 2022	Nick DeSimone	2-year	
July 13, 2022	Trevor Lewis	1-year	
July 13, 2022	Colton Poolman	1-year	
July 13, 2022	Nikita Zadorov	2-year	
July 22, 2022	Matthew Phillips	1-year	
August 2, 2022	Oliver Kylington	2-year	
August 2, 2022	Andrew Mangiapane	3-year	
August 2, 2022	Martin Pospisil	1-year	
August 4, 2022	Jonathan Huberdeau	8-year‡	
September 21, 2022	Brett Ritchie	1-year	
September 21, 2022	Adam Ruzicka	2-year	
October 7, 2022	MacKenzie Weegar	8-year‡	
October 11, 2022	Michael Stone	1-year	
October 30, 2022	Lucas Ciona	3-year†	
March 26, 2023	Matthew Coronato	3-year†	
March 29, 2023	William Stromgren	3-year†‡	
April 24, 2023	Walker Duehr	2-year‡	
June 6, 2023	Oscar Dansk	1-year‡	
June 14, 2023	Clark Bishop	2-year‡	

== Draft picks ==
Below are the Calgary Flames' selections at the 2022 NHL entry draft, which was held on July 7 to 8, 2022, at Bell Centre in Montreal.

Round	#	Player	Pos.	Nationality	Team (League)
2	59	Topi Ronni	D	Finland	Tappara (Liiga)
5	155	Parker Bell	LW	Canada	Tri-City Americans (WHL)
7	219	Cade Littler	C	USA	Wenatchee Wild (BCHL)
