= 2022–23 Dallas Stars season =

National Hockey League season

2022–23 Dallas Stars
- Division: 2nd Central
- Conference: 4th Western
- 2022–23 record: 47–21–14
- Home record: 22–10–9
- Road record: 25–11–5
- Goals for: 285
- Goals against: 218

Team information
- General manager: Jim Nill
- Coach: Peter DeBoer
- Captain: Jamie Benn
- Alternate captains: Miro Heiskanen; Esa Lindell; Joe Pavelski; Tyler Seguin
- Arena: American Airlines Center
- Average attendance: 18,371
- Minor league affiliates: Texas Stars (AHL); Idaho Steelheads (ECHL)

Team leaders
- Goals: Jason Robertson (46)
- Assists: Jason Robertson (63)
- Points: Jason Robertson (109)
- Penalty minutes: Mason Marchment (80)
- Plus/minus: Joe Pavelski (+42)
- Wins: Jake Oettinger (37)
- Goals against average: Jake Oettinger (2.37)

The 2022–23 Dallas Stars season was the 56th season for National Hockey League franchise that was established on June 5, 1967, and the 30th season since the franchise relocated from Minnesota prior to the start of the 1993–94 NHL season.

The first game of the season was played at Bridgestone Arena against the Nashville Predators on October 13, 2022, with the first home game against the Predators at American Airlines Center on October 15. During the off-season, Rick Bowness resigned as head coach of the Stars, and Peter DeBoer was hired to replace him. On April 3, 2023, the Stars clinched a playoff spot after a win over the Nashville Predators. In the playoffs, the Stars defeated the Minnesota Wild in the first round in six games. Then, they defeated the Seattle Kraken in the second round in seven games before losing to the top-seeded and eventual Stanley Cup champion Vegas Golden Knights in six games in conference finals.

== Standings ==
=== Divisional standings ===
Central Division
Pos	Team	GP	W	L	OTL	RW	GF	GA	GD	Pts
1	y – Colorado Avalanche	82	51	24	7	36	280	226	+54	109
2	x – Dallas Stars	82	47	21	14	39	285	218	+67	108
3	x – Minnesota Wild	82	46	25	11	34	246	225	+21	103
4	x – Winnipeg Jets	82	46	33	3	36	247	225	+22	95
5	Nashville Predators	82	42	32	8	29	229	238	−9	92
6	St. Louis Blues	82	37	38	7	27	263	301	−38	81
7	Arizona Coyotes	82	28	40	14	20	228	299	−71	70
8	Chicago Blackhawks	82	26	49	7	18	204	301	−97	59

Source: National Hockey League
Rules for classification: 1) Fewer number of games played (GP, only during regular season); 2) Greater number of regulation wins (RW); 3) Greater number of wins in regulation and overtime, excluding shootout wins (ROW); 4) Greater number of total wins, including shootouts (W); 5) Greater number of points earned in head-to-head play; if teams played an uneven number of head-to-head games, the result of the first game on the home ice of the team with the extra home game is discarded; 6) Greater goal differential (GD); 7) Greater number of goals scored (GF)
x – Clinched playoff spot; y – Clinched division

=== Conference standings ===
Western Conference Wild Card
Pos	Div	Team	GP	W	L	OTL	RW	GF	GA	GD	Pts
1	PA	x – Seattle Kraken	82	46	28	8	37	289	256	+33	100
2	CE	x – Winnipeg Jets	82	46	33	3	36	247	225	+22	95
3	PA	Calgary Flames	82	38	27	17	31	260	252	+8	93
4	CE	Nashville Predators	82	42	32	8	29	229	238	−9	92
5	PA	Vancouver Canucks	82	38	37	7	24	276	298	−22	83
6	CE	St. Louis Blues	82	37	38	7	27	263	301	−38	81
7	CE	Arizona Coyotes	82	28	40	14	20	228	299	−71	70
8	PA	San Jose Sharks	82	22	44	16	16	234	321	−87	60
9	CE	Chicago Blackhawks	82	26	49	7	18	204	301	−97	59
10	PA	Anaheim Ducks	82	23	47	12	13	209	338	−129	58

Source: National Hockey League
Rules for classification: 1) Fewer number of games played (GP, only during regular season); 2) Greater number of regulation wins (RW); 3) Greater number of wins in regulation and overtime, excluding shootout wins (ROW); 4) Greater number of total wins, including shootouts (W); 5) Greater number of points earned in head-to-head play; if teams played an uneven number of head-to-head games, the result of the first game on the home ice of the team with the extra home game is discarded; 6) Greater goal differential (GD); 7) Greater number of goals scored (GF)
x – Clinched playoff spot

== Schedule and results ==
=== Preseason ===
The Stars Preseason schedule was released on July 5, 2022.

2022 preseason game log: 2–5–0 (home: 1–3–0; road: 1–2–0)
#	Date	Away	Score	Home	OT	Decision	Location	Attendance	Record	Recap
1	September 26	St. Louis	4–0	Dallas		Khudobin	American Airlines Center	10,023	0–1–0
2	September 27	Arizona	3–4	Dallas	OT	Wedgewood	BOK Center	—	1–1–0
3	September 29	Minnesota	5–2	Dallas		Khudobin	American Airlines Center	12,114	1–2–0
4	October 1	Dallas	5–2	St. Louis		Oettinger	Cable Dahmer Arena	—	2–2–0
5	October 3	Colorado	3–1	Dallas		Oettinger	American Airlines Center	12,678	2–3–0
6	October 5	Dallas	1–2	Colorado		Khudobin	Ball Arena	14,953	2–4–0
7	October 8	Dallas	1–5	Minnesota		Oettinger	Xcel Energy Center	16,324	2–5–0
Legend: Win Loss OT/SO Loss

=== Regular season ===
The regular season schedule was released on July 6, 2022.

2022–23 game log

October: 5–3–1 (home: 3–1–0; road: 2–2–1)
#	Date	Visitor	Score	Home	OT	Decision	Attendance	Record	Pts	Recap
1	October 13	Dallas	4–1	Nashville		Oettinger	17,692	1–0–0	2
2	October 15	Nashville	1–5	Dallas		Oettinger	18,532	2–0–0	4
3	October 17	Winnipeg	1–4	Dallas		Oettinger	17,875	3–0–0	6
4	October 20	Dallas	2–3	Toronto	OT	Wedgewood	18,488	3–0–1	7
5	October 22	Dallas	5–2	Montreal		Oettinger	21,105	4–0–1	9
6	October 24	Dallas	2–4	Ottawa		Wedgewood	12,088	4–1–1	9
7	October 25	Dallas	1–3	Boston		Oettinger	17,850	4–2–1	9
8	October 27	Washington	0–2	Dallas		Oettinger	18,235	5–2–1	11
9	October 29	NY Rangers	6–3	Dallas		Wedgewood	18,532	5–3–1	11

November: 8–3–3 (home: 3–1–2; road: 5–2–1)
#	Date	Visitor	Score	Home	OT	Decision	Attendance	Record	Pts	Recap
10	November 1	Los Angeles	2–5	Dallas		Wedgewood	18,374	6–3–1	13
11	November 3	Dallas	7–2	Arizona		Wedgewood	4,600	7–3–1	15
12	November 5	Dallas	6–2	Edmonton		Wedgewood	17,067	8–3–1	17
13	November 8	Dallas	1–5	Winnipeg		Wedgewood	13,847	8–4–1	17
14	November 11	San Jose	5–4	Dallas		Oettinger	18,532	8–5–1	17
15	November 13	Dallas	5–1	Philadelphia		Oettinger	16,898	9–5–1	19
16	November 15	Dallas	4–5	Tampa Bay	OT	Oettinger	19,092	9–5–2	20
17	November 17	Dallas	6–4	Florida		Wedgewood	14,428	10–5–2	22
18	November 19	NY Islanders	2–5	Dallas		Oettinger	18,532	11–5–2	24
19	November 21	Colorado	3–2	Dallas	SO	Oettinger	18,532	11–5–3	25
20	November 23	Chicago	4–6	Dallas		Oettinger	18,532	12–5–3	27
21	November 25	Winnipeg	5–4	Dallas	OT	Oettinger	18,532	12–5–4	28
22	November 26	Dallas	1–4	Colorado		Wedgewood	18,129	12–6–4	28
23	November 28	Dallas	4–1	St. Louis		Wedgewood	18,096	13–6–4	30

December: 10–3–2 (home: 5–2–1; road: 5–1–1)
#	Date	Visitor	Score	Home	OT	Decision	Attendance	Record	Pts	Recap
24	December 1	Anaheim	0–5	Dallas		Oettinger	18,012	14–6–4	32
25	December 4	Minnesota	6–5	Dallas	SO	Wedgewood	18,120	14–6–5	33
26	December 6	Toronto	4–0	Dallas		Oettinger	18,021	14–7–5	33
27	December 8	Ottawa	3–4	Dallas	OT	Oettinger	18,023	15–7–5	35
28	December 10	Detroit	2–3	Dallas	OT	Oettinger	18,532	16–7–5	37
29	December 12	Dallas	1–2	Pittsburgh		Oettinger	17,147	16–8–5	37
30	December 13	Dallas	4–1	New Jersey		Wedgewood	13,114	17–8–5	39
31	December 15	Dallas	2–1	Washington		Oettinger	18,573	18–8–5	41
32	December 17	Dallas	4–5	Carolina	OT	Wedgewood	18,680	18–8–6	42
33	December 19	Dallas	2–1	Columbus		Oettinger	16,402	19–8–6	44
34	December 21	Edmonton	6–3	Dallas		Oettinger	18,532	19–9–6	44
35	December 23	Montreal	2–4	Dallas		Oettinger	18,532	20–9–6	46
36	December 27	Dallas	3–2	Nashville		Oettinger	17,768	21–9–6	48
37	December 29	Dallas	4–1	Minnesota		Oettinger	19,316	22–9–6	50
38	December 31	San Jose	2–5	Dallas		Oettinger	18,532	23–9–6	52

January: 5–4–4 (home: 2–1–3; road: 3–3–1)
#	Date	Visitor	Score	Home	OT	Decision	Attendance	Record	Pts	Recap
39	January 3	Dallas	2–3	Los Angeles		Oettinger	16,498	23–10–6	52
40	January 4	Dallas	0–2	Anaheim		Wedgewood	13,179	23–11–6	52
41	January 8	Florida	1–5	Dallas		Oettinger	18,532	24–11–6	54
42	January 10	Dallas	2–1	NY Islanders	SO	Oettinger	16,412	25–11–6	56
43	January 12	Dallas	1–2	NY Rangers	OT	Oettinger	18,006	25–11–7	57
44	January 14	Calgary	6–5	Dallas		Wedgewood	18,532	25–12–7	57
45	January 16	Dallas	4–0	Vegas		Oettinger	17,895	26–12–7	59
46	January 18	Dallas	3–5	San Jose		Oettinger	12,315	26–13–7	59
47	January 19	Dallas	4–0	Los Angeles		Wedgewood	18,230	27–13–7	61
48	January 21	Arizona	0–4	Dallas		Oettinger	18,532	28–13–7	63
49	January 23	Buffalo	3–2	Dallas	OT	Oettinger	18,134	28–13–8	64
50	January 25	Carolina	3–2	Dallas	OT	Oettinger	18,237	28–13–9	65
51	January 27	New Jersey	3–2	Dallas	OT	Oettinger	18,532	28–13–10	66

February: 3–3–3 (home: 2–3–2; road: 1–0–1)
#	Date	Visitor	Score	Home	OT	Decision	Attendance	Record	Pts	Recap
52	February 6	Anaheim	2–3	Dallas	SO	Oettinger	18,145	29–13–10	68
53	February 8	Minnesota	1–4	Dallas		Oettinger	18,274	30–13–10	70
54	February 11	Tampa Bay	3–1	Dallas		Wedgewood	18,532	30–14–10	70
55	February 14	Boston	3–2	Dallas	OT	Oettinger	18,532	30–14–11	71
56	February 17	Dallas	1–2	Minnesota	SO	Oettinger	19,239	30–14–12	72
57	February 18	Columbus	4–1	Dallas		Wedgewood	18,532	30–15–12	72
58	February 22	Chicago	4–3	Dallas		Oettinger	18,326	30–16–12	72
59	February 25	Dallas	3–2	Vegas	SO	Oettinger	17,906	31–16–12	74
60	February 27	Vancouver	5–4	Dallas	OT	Oettinger	17,876	31–16–13	75

March: 10–4–1 (home: 3–2–1; road: 7–2–0)
#	Date	Visitor	Score	Home	OT	Decision	Attendance	Record	Pts	Recap
61	March 1	Arizona	2–4	Dallas		Oettinger	18,045	32–16–13	77
62	March 2	Dallas	5–2	Chicago		Murray	17,612	33–16–13	79
63	March 4	Colorado	3–7	Dallas		Oettinger	18,532	34–16–13	81
64	March 6	Calgary	5–4	Dallas		Oettinger	18,164	34–17–13	81
65	March 9	Dallas	10–4	Buffalo		Oettinger	14,174	35–17–13	83
66	March 11	Dallas	4–3	Seattle	OT	Oettinger	17,151	36–17–13	85
67	March 13	Dallas	5–2	Seattle		Oettinger	17,151	37–17–13	87
68	March 14	Dallas	2–5	Vancouver		Murray	18,794	37–18–13	87
69	March 16	Dallas	1–4	Edmonton		Oettinger	18,347	37–19–13	87
70	March 18	Dallas	6–5	Calgary	OT	Oettinger	17,909	38–19–13	89
71	March 21	Seattle	5–4	Dallas	OT	Oettinger	18,532	38–19–14	90
72	March 23	Pittsburgh	2–3	Dallas		Oettinger	18,532	39–19–14	92
73	March 25	Vancouver	3–1	Dallas		Murray	18,532	39–20–14	92
74	March 28	Dallas	4–1	Chicago		Oettinger	14,060	40–20–14	94
75	March 31	Dallas	5–2	Arizona		Oettinger	4,600	41–20–14	96

April: 6–1–0 (home: 4–0–0; road: 2–1–0)
#	Date	Visitor	Score	Home	OT	Decision	Attendance	Record	Pts	Recap
76	April 1	Dallas	2–5	Colorado		Oettinger	18,139	41–21–14	96
77	April 3	Nashville	1–5	Dallas		Wedgewood	18,056	42–21–14	98
78	April 6	Philadelphia	1–4	Dallas		Oettinger	18,532	43–21–14	100
79	April 8	Vegas	1–2	Dallas	SO	Oettinger	18,532	44–21–14	102
80	April 10	Dallas	6–1	Detroit		Oettinger	17,861	45–21–14	104
81	April 12	Dallas	5–2	St. Louis		Wedgewood	18,096	46–21–14	106
82	April 13	St. Louis	0–1	Dallas		Oettinger	18,532	47–21–14	108

Legend: Win (2 points) Loss (0 points) Overtime/shootout loss (1 point)

=== Playoffs ===
2023 Stanley Cup playoffs

Western Conference first round vs. (C3) Minnesota Wild: Dallas won 4–2
#	Date	Visitor	Score	Home	OT	Decision	Attendance	Series	Recap
1	April 17	Minnesota	3–2	Dallas	2OT	Oettinger	18,532	0–1
2	April 19	Minnesota	3–7	Dallas		Oettinger	18,532	1–1
3	April 21	Dallas	1–5	Minnesota		Oettinger	19,309	1–2
4	April 23	Dallas	3–2	Minnesota		Oettinger	19,331	2–2
5	April 25	Minnesota	0–4	Dallas		Oettinger	18,532	3–2
6	April 28	Dallas	4–1	Minnesota		Oettinger	19,389	4–2

Western Conference second round vs. (WC1) Seattle Kraken: Dallas won 4–3
#	Date	Visitor	Score	Home	OT	Decision	Attendance	Series	Recap
1	May 2	Seattle	5–4	Dallas	OT	Oettinger	18,532	0–1
2	May 4	Seattle	2–4	Dallas		Oettinger	18,532	1–1
3	May 7	Dallas	2–7	Seattle		Oettinger	17,151	1–2
4	May 9	Dallas	6–3	Seattle		Oettinger	17,151	2–2
5	May 11	Seattle	2–5	Dallas		Oettinger	18,532	3–2
6	May 13	Dallas	3–6	Seattle		Oettinger	17,151	3–3
7	May 15	Seattle	1–2	Dallas		Oettinger	18,756	4–3

Western Conference final vs. (P1) Vegas Golden Knights: Vegas won 4–2
#	Date	Visitor	Score	Home	OT	Decision	Attendance	Series	Recap
1	May 19	Dallas	3–4	Vegas	OT	Oettinger	18,271	0–1
2	May 21	Dallas	2–3	Vegas	OT	Oettinger	18,358	0–2
3	May 23	Vegas	4–0	Dallas		Oettinger	18,532	0–3
4	May 25	Vegas	2–3	Dallas	OT	Oettinger	18,532	1–3
5	May 27	Dallas	4–2	Vegas		Oettinger	18,546	2–3
6	May 29	Vegas	6–0	Dallas		Oettinger	18,532	2–4

Legend: Win Loss

== Player statistics ==
Final stats

=== Skaters ===
Regular season
Player	GP	G	A	Pts	+/–	PIM
Jason Robertson	82	46	63	109	+37	20
Jamie Benn	82	33	45	78	+23	34
Joe Pavelski	82	28	49	77	+42	8
Roope Hintz	73	37	38	75	+31	30
Miro Heiskanen	79	11	62	73	+12	32
Tyler Seguin	76	21	29	50	+3	24
Wyatt Johnston	82	24	17	41	+6	20
Mason Marchment	68	12	19	31	–6	80
Ty Dellandrea	82	9	19	28	+9	54
Ryan Suter	82	3	22	25	0	26
Esa Lindell	82	8	16	24	+29	10
Colin Miller	79	6	15	21	+23	37
Radek Faksa	81	11	9	20	+9	39
Jani Hakanpää	82	6	10	16	+18	60
Nils Lundkvist	60	6	10	16	–5	26
Evgenii Dadonov^{†}	23	3	12	15	+2	2
Joel Kiviranta	70	8	1	9	–9	40
Denis Gurianov^{‡}	43	2	7	9	–2	4
Max Domi^{†}	20	2	5	7	–6	6
Luke Glendening	70	3	3	6	–9	50
Fredrik Olofsson	28	1	3	4	0	2
Joel Hanley	26	0	2	2	+5	15
Thomas Harley	6	0	2	2	+5	2
Matěj Blümel	6	1	0	1	–2	0
Riley Tufte	3	0	0	0	–1	0
Fredrik Karlström	5	0	0	0	+1	0
Jacob Peterson^{‡}	1	0	0	0	–2	0
Marián Studenič	3	0	0	0	–1	0

Playoffs
Player	GP	G	A	Pts	+/−	PIM
Roope Hintz	19	10	14	24	+4	8
Jason Robertson	19	7	11	18	0	2
Joe Pavelski	14	9	5	14	–1	2
Max Domi^{†}	19	3	10	13	–3	52
Miro Heiskanen	19	1	11	12	–6	8
Jamie Benn	17	3	8	11	–1	51
Evgenii Dadonov^{†}	16	4	6	10	+5	2
Tyler Seguin	19	5	4	9	–8	4
Thomas Harley	19	1	8	9	+1	14
Mason Marchment	18	4	2	6	–8	18
Wyatt Johnston	19	4	2	6	–4	4
Ryan Suter	19	0	6	6	–3	18
Joel Kiviranta	15	1	4	5	0	2
Ty Dellandrea	15	3	0	3	–4	22
Luke Glendening	17	2	1	3	–5	2
Radek Faksa	19	1	2	3	–5	10
Esa Lindell	19	0	3	3	–10	8
Jani Hakanpää	15	1	1	2	–3	16
Colin Miller	10	0	1	1	–2	4
Joel Hanley	13	0	1	1	+5	4
Fredrik Olofsson	2	0	0	0	+1	0

=== Goaltenders ===
Regular season
Player	GP	GS	TOI	W	L	OT	GA	GAA	SA	SV%	SO	G	A	PIM
Jake Oettinger	62	61	3,644:53	37	11	11	144	2.37	1776	.919	5	0	1	2
Scott Wedgewood	21	18	1,126:46	9	8	3	51	2.72	603	.915	1	0	0	0
Matt Murray	3	3	177:02	1	2	0	10	3.39	64	.844	0	0	0	0

Playoffs
Player	GP	GS	TOI	W	L	GA	GAA	SA	SV%	SO	G	A	PIM
Jake Oettinger	19	19	1,077:46	10	9	55	3.06	525	.895	1	0	0	0
Scott Wedgewood	3	0	105:21	0	0	4	2.28	29	.862	0	0	0	0

^{†}Denotes player spent time with another team before joining the Stars. Stats reflect time with the Stars only.
^{‡}Denotes player was traded mid-season. Stats reflect time with the Stars only.
Bold/italics denotes franchise record.

== Transactions ==
The Stars have been involved in the following transactions during the 2022–23 season.

Key:

† Contract is entry-level.
‡ Contract initially takes effect in the 2023–24 season.

=== Trades ===
Date	Details		Ref
September 19, 2022	To New York Rangers Conditional^{1} 1st-round pick in 2023; Conditional^{2} 4th-round pick in 2025	To Dallas Stars Nils Lundkvist	
December 15, 2022	To Buffalo Sabres Joseph Cecconi	To Dallas Stars Oskari Laaksonen	
February 26, 2023	To Montreal Canadiens Denis Gurianov	To Dallas Stars Evgenii Dadonov	
March 2, 2023	To Chicago Blackhawks Anton Khudobin; 2nd-round pick in 2025	To Dallas Stars Max Domi; Dylan Wells	
March 3, 2023	To San Jose Sharks Jacob Peterson	To Dallas Stars Scott Reedy	

Notes:

1. If Dallas' 1st-round pick is within the top 10 selections, New York will instead receive Dallas' 1st-round pick in 2024.
2. If Lundkvist accumulates a combined 55 points over the 2022–23 and 2023–24 seasons, New York will instead receive Dallas' 3rd-round pick in 2025.

=== Players acquired ===
Date	Player	Former team	Term	Via	Ref
July 13, 2022	Mason Marchment	Florida Panthers	4-year	Free agency	
July 13, 2022	Colin Miller	Buffalo Sabres	2-year	Free agency	
July 14, 2022	Riley Barber	Detroit Red Wings	1-year	Free agency	
July 22, 2022	Will Butcher	Buffalo Sabres	1-year	Free agency	
November 2, 2022	Matt Murray	Texas Stars (AHL)	1-year†	Free agency	
March 10, 2023	Kyle McDonald	North Bay Battalion (OHL)	3-year†‡	Free agency	
March 18, 2023	Chase Wheatcroft	Prince George Cougars (WHL)	3-year†‡	Free agency	

=== Players lost ===
Date	Player	New team	Term	Via	Ref
July 13, 2022	Joel L'Esperance	Grand Rapids Griffins (AHL)	2-year	Free agency	
July 13, 2022	Vladislav Namestnikov	Tampa Bay Lightning	1-year	Free agency	
July 14, 2022	Alexander Radulov	Ak Bars Kazan (KHL)	2-year	Free agency	
July 18, 2022	Andrej Sekera			Retirement	
July 23, 2022	Evgeniy Oksentyuk			Contract termination	
July 29, 2022	John Klingberg	Anaheim Ducks	1-year	Free agency	
August 1, 2022	Jordan Kawaguchi	Texas Stars (AHL)	1-year	Free agency	
August 1, 2022	Alexei Lipanov	Spartak Moscow (KHL)	1-year	Free agency	
August 4, 2022	Michael Raffl	Lausanne HC (NL)	2-year	Free agency	
August 22, 2022	Colton Point	Fort Wayne Komets (ECHL)	1-year	Free agency	
May 26, 2023	Oskari Laaksonen	Luleå HF (SHL)	2-year‡	Free agency	

=== Signings ===
Date	Player	Term	Ref
July 11, 2022	Marian Studenic	1-year	
July 29, 2022	Ben Gleason	1-year	
August 25, 2022	Francesco Arcuri	3-year†	
September 1, 2022	Jake Oettinger	3-year	
October 5, 2022	Jason Robertson	4-year	
November 29, 2022	Roope Hintz	8-year‡	
January 1, 2023	Joe Pavelski	1-year‡	
March 2, 2023	Gavin White	3-year†‡	
March 8, 2023	Christian Kyrou	3-year†‡	
March 29, 2023	Matthew Seminoff	3-year†‡	
May 6, 2023	Lian Bichsel	3-year†‡	
June 6, 2023	Fredrik Karlstrom	1-year‡	
June 7, 2023	Alex Petrovic	1-year‡	
June 15, 2023	Matt Murray	1-year‡	
June 27, 2023	Evgeni Dadonov	2-year‡	

== Draft picks ==
Below are the Dallas Stars' selections at the 2022 NHL entry draft, which was held on July 7 to 8, 2022, at Bell Centre in Montreal.

Round	#	Player	Pos.	Nationality	Team (League)
1	18	Lian Bichsel	D	Switzerland	Leksands IF (SHL)
2	50	Christian Kyrou	D	Canada	Erie Otters (OHL)
3	83	George Fegaras	D	Canada	North York Rangers (OJHL)
4	115	Gavin White	D	Canada	Hamilton Bulldogs (OHL)
5	147	Maxim Mayorov	G	Russia	Ladia Togliatti (MHL)
6	179	Matthew Seminoff	RW	Canada	Kamloops Blazers (WHL)
