= Calle Odelius =

Swedish ice hockey player (born 2004)

- Born: 30 May 2004 (age 22) Nykvarn, Sweden
- Height: 183 cm (6 ft 0 in)
- Weight: 93 kg (205 lb; 14 st 9 lb)
- Position: Defence
- Shoots: Left
- NHL team (P) Cur. team Former teams: New York Islanders; Hamilton Hammers (AHL); Djurgårdens IF; Färjestad BK
- NHL draft: 65th overall, 2022; New York Islanders
- Playing career: 2022–present

Calle Odelius (born 30 May 2004) is a Swedish professional ice hockey defenceman for the Hamilton Hammers of the American Hockey League (AHL) as a prospect under contract to the New York Islanders of the National Hockey League (NHL). Odelius was selected by the New York Islanders in the second round, 65th overall, of the 2022 NHL entry draft.

== Playing career ==
Odelius made his Swedish Hockey League (SHL) debut during the 2021–22 season, playing seven games with Djurgårdens IF. After the season he was selected 65th overall by the New York Islanders in the 2022 NHL entry draft. He signed a three-year, entry-level contract with the Islanders on 31 August 2022, and was loaned to Djurgårdens IF for the 2022–23 season. During the season he played in J20 Nationell and HockeyAllsvenskan with Djurgårdens IF's farm teams, and was then loaned to Färjestad BK on 1 February 2023, to play in the SHL.

For the 2023–24 season Odelius was loaned to Djurgårdens IF on 8 October 2023, after attending in preseason training camp with the Islanders.

== Career statistics ==
=== Regular season and playoffs ===
			Regular season					Playoffs
Season	Team	League	GP	G	A	Pts	PIM	GP	G	A	Pts	PIM
2019–20	Djurgårdens IF	J18	11	0	1	1	6	—	—	—	—	—
2020–21	Djurgårdens IF	J18	6	0	3	3	6	—	—	—	—	—
2021–22	Djurgårdens IF	J18	1	0	1	1	2	4	1	2	3	2
2021–22	Djurgårdens IF	J20	43	7	23	30	24	6	0	2	2	0
2021–22	Djurgårdens IF	SHL	7	0	0	0	0	—	—	—	—	—
2022–23	Djurgårdens IF	Allsv	43	1	10	11	14	17	1	2	3	8
2022–23	Djurgårdens IF	J20	2	0	1	1	0	1	0	0	0	2
2022–23	Färjestad BK	SHL	2	0	0	0	0	—	—	—	—	—
2023–24	Djurgårdens IF	Allsv	10	0	4	4	2	6	0	1	1	6
2023–24	Djurgårdens IF	J20	—	—	—	—	—	5	2	1	3	2
2024–25	Bridgeport Islanders	AHL	62	1	12	13	20	—	—	—	—	—
2025–26	Bridgeport Islanders	AHL	20	1	2	3	2	—	—	—	—	—
2025–26	Worcester Railers	ECHL	23	2	6	8	4	—	—	—	—	—
SHL totals			9	0	0	0	0	—	—	—	—	—

Medal record

Representing Sweden

Ice hockey

World U18 Championships
Gold medal – first place	2022 Germany	

=== International ===
Year	Team	Event	Result	GP	G	A	Pts	PIM
2021	Sweden	HG18	3rd place, bronze medalist(s)	5	0	1	1	0
2022	Sweden	U18	1st place, gold medalist(s)	6	0	3	3	12
2023	Sweden	WJC	4th	7	1	0	1	2
Junior totals				18	1	4	5	14
