= 2022–23 St. Louis Blues season =

National Hockey League season

2022–23 St. Louis Blues
- Division: 6th Central
- Conference: 12th Western
- 2022–23 record: 37–38–7
- Home record: 18–17–6
- Road record: 19–21–1
- Goals for: 263
- Goals against: 301

Team information
- General manager: Doug Armstrong
- Coach: Craig Berube
- Captain: Ryan O'Reilly (Oct. 15 – Feb. 17); Vacant (Feb. 17 – Apr. 13)
- Alternate captains: Colton Parayko; Brayden Schenn; Vladimir Tarasenko (Oct. 15 – Feb. 9); Rotating (Feb. 17 – Apr. 13)
- Arena: Enterprise Center
- Average attendance: 18,075
- Minor league affiliate: Springfield Thunderbirds (AHL)

Team leaders
- Goals: Jordan Kyrou (37)
- Assists: Robert Thomas (47)
- Points: Jordan Kyrou (73)
- Penalty minutes: Brayden Schenn (50)
- Plus/minus: Calle Rosen (+19)
- Wins: Jordan Binnington (27)
- Goals against average: Joel Hofer (3.22)

The 2022–23 St. Louis Blues season was the 56th season for the National Hockey League (NHL) franchise that was established in 1967. On April 2, 2023, the Blues lost in a shootout to the Boston Bruins, and failed to qualify for the playoffs for the first time since the 2017–18 season, and only the second time since 2010–11.

== Standings ==
=== Divisional standings ===
Central Division
Pos	Team	GP	W	L	OTL	RW	GF	GA	GD	Pts
1	y – Colorado Avalanche	82	51	24	7	36	280	226	+54	109
2	x – Dallas Stars	82	47	21	14	39	285	218	+67	108
3	x – Minnesota Wild	82	46	25	11	34	246	225	+21	103
4	x – Winnipeg Jets	82	46	33	3	36	247	225	+22	95
5	Nashville Predators	82	42	32	8	29	229	238	−9	92
6	St. Louis Blues	82	37	38	7	27	263	301	−38	81
7	Arizona Coyotes	82	28	40	14	20	228	299	−71	70
8	Chicago Blackhawks	82	26	49	7	18	204	301	−97	59

Source: National Hockey League
Rules for classification: 1) Fewer number of games played (GP, only during regular season); 2) Greater number of regulation wins (RW); 3) Greater number of wins in regulation and overtime, excluding shootout wins (ROW); 4) Greater number of total wins, including shootouts (W); 5) Greater number of points earned in head-to-head play; if teams played an uneven number of head-to-head games, the result of the first game on the home ice of the team with the extra home game is discarded; 6) Greater goal differential (GD); 7) Greater number of goals scored (GF)
x – Clinched playoff spot; y – Clinched division

=== Conference standings ===
Western Conference Wild Card
Pos	Div	Team	GP	W	L	OTL	RW	GF	GA	GD	Pts
1	PA	x – Seattle Kraken	82	46	28	8	37	289	256	+33	100
2	CE	x – Winnipeg Jets	82	46	33	3	36	247	225	+22	95
3	PA	Calgary Flames	82	38	27	17	31	260	252	+8	93
4	CE	Nashville Predators	82	42	32	8	29	229	238	−9	92
5	PA	Vancouver Canucks	82	38	37	7	24	276	298	−22	83
6	CE	St. Louis Blues	82	37	38	7	27	263	301	−38	81
7	CE	Arizona Coyotes	82	28	40	14	20	228	299	−71	70
8	PA	San Jose Sharks	82	22	44	16	16	234	321	−87	60
9	CE	Chicago Blackhawks	82	26	49	7	18	204	301	−97	59
10	PA	Anaheim Ducks	82	23	47	12	13	209	338	−129	58

Source: National Hockey League
Rules for classification: 1) Fewer number of games played (GP, only during regular season); 2) Greater number of regulation wins (RW); 3) Greater number of wins in regulation and overtime, excluding shootout wins (ROW); 4) Greater number of total wins, including shootouts (W); 5) Greater number of points earned in head-to-head play; if teams played an uneven number of head-to-head games, the result of the first game on the home ice of the team with the extra home game is discarded; 6) Greater goal differential (GD); 7) Greater number of goals scored (GF)
x – Clinched playoff spot

== Schedule and results ==
=== Preseason ===
The Blues Preseason schedule was released on July 5, 2022.

2022 preseason game log: 6–2–0 (Home: 3–1–0; Road: 3–1–0)
#	Date	Away	Score	Home	Decision	Location	Attendance	Record	Recap
1	September 24	St. Louis	5–4	Arizona	Hofer	Intrust Bank Arena	8,475	1–0–0
2	September 26	St. Louis	4–0	Dallas	Greiss	American Airlines Center	10,023	2–0–0
3	September 27	St. Louis	4–1	Chicago	Zherenko	United Center	10,317	3–0–0
4	September 29	Columbus	2–4	St. Louis	Greiss	Enterprise Center	16,637	4–0–0
5	October 1	Dallas	5–2	St. Louis	Hofer	Cable Dahmer Arena	5,807	4–1–0
6	October 4	Minnesota	2–4	St. Louis	Binnington	Enterprise Center	16,627	5–1–0
7	October 6	St. Louis	0–7	Columbus	Greiss	Nationwide Arena	12,110	5–2–0
8	October 8	Chicago	0–6	St. Louis	Binnington	Enterprise Center	18,096	6–2–0
Legend: Win Loss OT/SO Loss

=== Regular season ===
The regular season schedule was published on July 6, 2022.

2022–23 game log

October: 3–5–0 (home: 1–3–0; road: 2–2–0)
#	Date	Visitor	Score	Home	OT	Decision	Attendance	Record	Pts	Recap
1	October 15	Columbus	2–5	St. Louis		Binnington	18,096	1–0–0	2
2	October 19	St. Louis	4–3	Seattle	OT	Binnington	17,151	2–0–0	4
3	October 22	St. Louis	2–0	Edmonton		Binnington	17,102	3–0–0	6
4	October 24	St. Louis	0–4	Winnipeg		Greiss	13,936	3–1–0	6
5	October 26	Edmonton	3–1	St. Louis		Binnington	18,096	3–2–0	6
6	October 27	St. Louis	2–6	Nashville		Greiss	17,159	3–3–0	6
7	October 29	Montreal	7–4	St. Louis		Binnington	18,096	3–4–0	6
8	October 31	Los Angeles	5–1	St. Louis		Binnington	17,220	3–5–0	6

November: 8–6–0 (home: 4–2–0; road: 4–4–0)
#	Date	Visitor	Score	Home	OT	Decision	Attendance	Record	Pts	Recap
9	November 3	NY Islanders	5–2	St. Louis		Binnington	18,096	3–6–0	6
10	November 7	St. Louis	1–3	Boston		Binnington	17,850	3–7–0	6
11	November 8	St. Louis	1–5	Philadelphia		Greiss	15,228	3–8–0	6
12	November 10	San Jose	3–5	St. Louis		Binnington	18,096	4–8–0	8
13	November 12	St. Louis	3–2	Vegas		Binnington	18,343	5–8–0	10
14	November 14	St. Louis	3–2	Colorado		Binnington	18,104	6–8–0	12
15	November 16	St. Louis	5–2	Chicago		Binnington	16,284	7–8–0	14
16	November 17	Washington	4–5	St. Louis	SO	Greiss	18,096	8–8–0	16
17	November 19	Anaheim	2–6	St. Louis		Binnington	18,096	9–8–0	18
18	November 21	Anaheim	1–3	St. Louis		Binnington	18,096	10–8–0	20
19	November 23	St. Louis	2–6	Buffalo		Binnington	17,302	10–9–0	20
20	November 25	St. Louis	2–5	Tampa Bay		Binnington	19,092	10–10–0	20
21	November 26	St. Louis	5–4	Florida	OT	Greiss	15,649	11–10–0	22
22	November 28	Dallas	4–1	St. Louis		Binnington	18,096	11–11–0	22

December: 6–6–3 (home: 2–3–2; road: 4–3–1)
#	Date	Visitor	Score	Home	OT	Decision	Attendance	Record	Pts	Recap
23	December 1	Carolina	6–4	St. Louis		Binnington	18,096	11–12–0	22
24	December 3	St. Louis	2–6	Pittsburgh		Binnington	17,330	11–13–0	22
25	December 5	St. Louis	4–6	NY Rangers		Binnington	16,682	11–14–0	22
26	December 6	St. Louis	7–4	NY Islanders		Greiss	16,044	12–14–0	24
27	December 8	Winnipeg	5–2	St. Louis		Greiss	18,096	12–15–0	24
28	December 11	Colorado	3–2	St. Louis	OT	Binnington	18,096	12–15–1	25
29	December 12	Nashville	0–1	St. Louis	OT	Binnington	18,096	13–15–1	27
30	December 15	St. Louis	4–3	Edmonton	SO	Binnington	17,550	14–15–1	29
31	December 16	St. Louis	5–2	Calgary		Greiss	18,001	15–15–1	31
32	December 19	St. Louis	5–1	Vancouver		Binnington	18,692	16–15–1	33
33	December 20	St. Louis	2–5	Seattle		Greiss	17,151	16–16–1	33
34	December 23	St. Louis	4–5	Vegas	SO	Binnington	18,125	16–16–2	34
35	December 27	Toronto	5–4	St. Louis	OT	Binnington	18,096	16–16–3	35
36	December 29	Chicago	1–3	St. Louis		Binnington	18,096	17–16–3	37
37	December 31	Minnesota	5–2	St. Louis	18,096	Binnington		17–17–3	37

January: 6–8–0 (home: 3–4–0; road: 3–4–0)
#	Date	Visitor	Score	Home	OT	Decision	Attendance	Record	Pts	Recap
38	January 3	St. Louis	6–5	Toronto	SO	Binnington	18,553	18–17–3	39
39	January 5	St. Louis	5–3	New Jersey		Binnington	15,561	19–17–3	41
40	January 7	St. Louis	4–5	Montreal		Binnington	21,105	19–18–3	41
41	January 8	St. Louis	3–0	Minnesota		Greiss	18,745	20–18–3	43
42	January 10	Calgary	3–4	St. Louis	OT	Binnington	18,096	21–18–3	45
43	January 12	Calgary	4–1	St. Louis		Greiss	18,096	21–19–3	45
44	January 14	Tampa Bay	4–2	St. Louis		Binnington	18,096	21–20–3	45
45	January 16	Ottawa	1–2	St. Louis		Binnington	18,096	22–20–3	47
46	January 19	Nashville	2–5	St. Louis		Binnington	18,096	23–20–3	49
47	January 21	Chicago	5–2	St. Louis		Binnington	18,096	23–21–3	49
48	January 24	Buffalo	5–3	St. Louis		Binnington	18,096	23–22–3	49
49	January 26	St. Louis	0–5	Arizona		Greiss	4,600	23–23–3	49
50	January 28	St. Louis	2–4	Colorado		Binnington	18,137	23–24–3	49
51	January 30	St. Louis	2–4	Winnipeg		Binnington	13,756	23–25–3	49

February: 3–4–2 (home: 3–2–2; road: 0–2–0)
#	Date	Visitor	Score	Home	OT	Decision	Attendance	Record	Pts	Recap
52	February 11	Arizona	5–6	St. Louis	OT	Binnington	18,096	24–25–3	51
53	February 14	Florida	2–6	St. Louis		Binnington	18,096	25–25–3	53
54	February 16	New Jersey	2–4	St. Louis		Binnington	18,096	26–25–3	55
55	February 18	Colorado	4–1	St. Louis		Binnington	18,096	26–26–3	55
56	February 19	St. Louis	2–7	Ottawa		Greiss	18,871	26–27–3	55
57	February 21	St. Louis	1–4	Carolina		Binnington	18,142	26–28–3	55
58	February 23	Vancouver	3–2	St. Louis	OT	Binnington	18,096	26–28–4	56
59	February 25	Pittsburgh	3–2	St. Louis	OT	Binnington	18,096	26–28–5	57
60	February 28	Seattle	5–3	St. Louis		Binnington	18,096	26–29–5	57

March: 9–5–1 (home: 3–2–1; road: 6–3–0)
#	Date	Visitor	Score	Home	OT	Decision	Attendance	Record	Pts	Recap
61	March 2	St. Louis	6–3	San Jose		Greiss	12,290	27–29–5	59
62	March 4	St. Louis	2–4	Los Angeles		Binnington	18,230	27–30–5	59
63	March 7	St. Louis	2–6	Arizona		Binnington	4,600	27–31–5	59
64	March 9	San Jose	2–4	St. Louis		Binnington	18,096	28–31–5	61
65	March 11	St. Louis	5–2	Columbus		Greiss	18,222	29–31–5	63
66	March 13	Vegas	5–3	St. Louis		Binnington	18,096	29–32–5	63
67	March 15	Minnesota	8–5	St. Louis		Greiss	18,096	29–33–5	63
68	March 17	St. Louis	5–2	Washington		Hofer	18,573	30–33–5	65
69	March 19	Winnipeg	0–3	St. Louis		Hofer	18,096	31–33–5	67
70	March 21	Detroit	3–2	St. Louis	SO	Hofer	18,096	31–33–6	68
71	March 23	St. Louis	4–3	Detroit		Hofer	17,036	32–33–6	70
72	March 25	St. Louis	6–3	Anaheim		Binnington	15,237	33–33–6	72
73	March 26	St. Louis	6–7	Los Angeles		Binnington	18,230	33–34–6	72
74	March 28	Vancouver	5–6	St. Louis	OT	Binnington	18,096	34–34–6	74
75	March 30	St. Louis	5–3	Chicago		Binnington	16,465	35–34–6	76

April: 2–4–1 (home: 2–1–1; road: 0–3–0)
#	Date	Visitor	Score	Home	OT	Decision	Attendance	Record	Pts	Recap
76	April 1	St. Louis	1–6	Nashville		Greiss	17,348	35–35–6	76
77	April 2	Boston	4–3	St. Louis	SO	Binnington	18,096	35–35–7	77
78	April 4	Philadelphia	2–4	St. Louis		Binnington	18,096	36–35–7	79
79	April 6	NY Rangers	2–3	St. Louis	OT	Binnington	18,096	37–35–7	81
80	April 8	St. Louis	3–5	Minnesota		Binnington	17,954	37–36–7	81
81	April 12	Dallas	5–2	St. Louis		Hofer	18,096	37–37–7	81
82	April 13	St. Louis	0–1	Dallas		Binnington	18,532	37–38–7	81

Legend: Win (2 points) Loss (0 points) Overtime/shootout loss (1 point)

== Player statistics ==
=== Skaters ===
Regular season
Player	GP	G	A	Pts	+/−	PIM
Jordan Kyrou	79	37	36	73	−38	22
Pavel Buchnevich	63	26	41	67	+14	36
Brayden Schenn	82	21	44	65	−27	50
Robert Thomas	73	18	47	65	−8	22
Justin Faulk	82	11	39	50	−4	34
Brandon Saad	71	19	18	37	−8	12
Torey Krug	63	7	25	32	−26	49
Ivan Barbashev^{‡}	59	10	19	29	−10	36
Vladimir Tarasenko^{‡}	38	10	19	29	−18	8
Colton Parayko	79	4	23	27	−19	30
Nick Leddy	78	2	21	23	+4	20
Samuel Blais^{†}	31	9	11	20	+3	22
Ryan O'Reilly^{‡}	40	12	7	19	−24	10
Alexey Toropchenko	69	10	9	19	+6	12
Noel Acciari^{‡}	54	10	8	18	−6	10
Calle Rosen	49	8	10	18	+19	8
Tyler Pitlick	61	7	9	16	−1	14
Josh Leivo	51	4	12	16	0	25
Jakub Vrana^{†}	20	10	4	14	+2	10
Kasperi Kapanen^{†}	23	8	6	14	0	10
Jake Neighbours	43	6	4	10	−19	24
Nathan Walker	56	2	8	10	+10	25
Nikita Alexandrov	28	3	4	7	0	8
Logan Brown	30	2	4	6	−4	8
Robert Bortuzzo	43	2	3	5	+9	29
Tyler Tucker	26	1	3	4	−9	31
Niko Mikkola^{‡}	50	0	3	3	+2	35
Marco Scandella	20	1	1	2	+2	6
William Bitten	4	0	1	1	+1	0
Steven Santini	4	0	1	1	0	2
Matthew Highmore	2	0	0	0	+1	0
Matthew Kessel	2	0	0	0	−1	0
Hugh McGing	1	0	0	0	0	0
Dmitri Samorukov	2	0	0	0	−1	2

=== Goaltenders ===
Regular season
Player	GP	GS	TOI	W	L	OT	GA	GAA	SA	SV%	SO	G	A	PIM
Jordan Binnington	61	60	3,516:03	27	27	6	194	3.31	1,826	.894	2	0	2	29
Thomas Greiss	21	16	1,089:21	7	10	0	66	3.64	626	.896	1	0	0	0
Joel Hofer	6	6	317:12	3	1	1	17	3.22	179	.905	0	0	0	0

^{†}Denotes player spent time with another team before joining the Blues. Stats reflect time with the Blues only.
^{‡}Denotes player was traded mid-season. Stats reflect time with the Blues only.

== Transactions ==
The Blues have been involved in the following transactions during the 2022–23 season.

Key:

† Contract is entry-level.
‡ Contract initially takes effect in the 2023-24 season.

=== Trades ===
Date	Details		Ref
July 8, 2022	To Detroit Red Wings Ville Husso	To St. Louis Blues 3rd-round pick in 2022	
October 9, 2022	To Edmonton Oilers Klim Kostin	To St. Louis Blues Dmitri Samorukov	
February 9, 2023	To New York Rangers Niko Mikkola; Vladimir Tarasenko^{1}	To St. Louis Blues Samuel Blais; Hunter Skinner; Conditional DAL 1st-round pick in 2023 or NYR 1st-round pick in 2023; Conditional 3rd-round pick in 2024 or 4th-round pick in 2024	
February 17, 2023	To Minnesota Wild Ryan O'Reilly	To St. Louis Blues Josh Pillar	
February 17, 2023	To Toronto Maple Leafs Noel Acciari	To St. Louis Blues Mikhail Abramov; Adam Gaudette; 1st-round pick in 2023; OTT 3rd-round pick in 2023; 2nd-round pick in 2024	
February 26, 2023	To Vegas Golden Knights Ivan Barbashev	To St. Louis Blues Zach Dean	
March 3, 2023	To Detroit Red Wings Dylan McLauglin; 7th-round pick in 2025	To St. Louis Blues Jakub Vrana	
March 8, 2023	To Nashville Predators Anthony Angello	To St. Louis Blues Future considerations	

Notes:

- Blues retain 50% of Tarasenko's salary

=== Players acquired ===
Date	Player	Former team	Term	Via	Ref
July 13, 2022	Thomas Greiss	Detroit Red Wings	1-year	Free agency	
July 13, 2022	Noel Acciari	Florida Panthers	1-year	Free agency	
July 14, 2022	Anthony Angello	Pittsburgh Penguins	1-year	Free agency	
July 14, 2022	Matthew Highmore	Vancouver Canucks	1-year	Free agency	
July 14, 2022	Josh Leivo	Carolina Hurricanes	1-year	Free agency	
July 14, 2022	Dylan McLaughlin	Chicago Blackhawks	1-year	Free agency	
July 15, 2022	Martin Frk	Los Angeles Kings	1-year	Free agency	
October 25, 2022	Tyler Pitlick	Montreal Canadiens	1-year	Free agency	
February 25, 2023	Kasperi Kapanen	Pittsburgh Penguins		Waivers	
March 6, 2023	Anton Malmstrom	Bowling Green Falcons (CCHA)	2-year†	Free agency	
May 8, 2023	Andre Heim	HC Ambrì-Piotta (NL)	2-year†	Free agency	

=== Players lost ===
Date	Player	New team	Term	Via	Ref
July 13, 2022	Dakota Joshua	Vancouver Canucks	2-year	Free agency	
July 13, 2022	Charlie Lindgren	Washington Capitals	3-year	Free agency	
July 13, 2022	David Perron	Detroit Red Wings	2-year	Free agency	
July 15, 2022	Mackenzie MacEachern	Carolina Hurricanes	1-year	Free agency	
July 21, 2022	Tanner Kaspick	Iowa Wild (AHL)	1-year	Free agency	
August 15, 2022	Sam Anas	Hershey Bears (AHL)	1-year	Free agency	
April 24, 2023	Martin Frk	SC Bern (NL)	2-year‡	Free agency	

=== Signings ===
Date	Player	Term	Ref
July 12, 2022	Hugh McGing	1-year	
July 13, 2022	William Bitten	2-year	
July 13, 2022	Nick Leddy	4-year	
July 13, 2022	Robert Thomas	8-year	
July 14, 2022	Scott Perunovich	1-year	
July 14, 2022	Nathan Walker	1-year	
July 17, 2022	Niko Mikkola	1-year	
July 25, 2022	Nathan Todd	1-year	
July 27, 2022	Klim Kostin	1-year	
September 13, 2022	Jordan Kyrou	8-year	
December 17, 2022	Marc-Andre Gaudet	3-year†	
April 28, 2023	Leo Loof	3-year†‡	
March 1, 2023	Michael Buchinger	3-year†‡	
March 2, 2023	Samuel Blais	1-year‡	
March 9, 2023	Mathias Laferriere	1-year‡	
June 21, 2023	Adam Gaudette	1-year‡	
June 24, 2023	Scott Perunovich	1-year‡	

== Draft picks ==
Below are the St. Louis Blues selections at the 2022 NHL entry draft, which were held on July 7 to 8, 2022. It was held at the Bell Centre in Montreal, Quebec.

Round	#	Player	Pos	Nationality	College/Junior/Club team (League)
1	23	Jimmy Snuggerud	RW	United States	U.S. NTDP (USHL)
3	73^{3}	Aleksanteri Kaskimaki	C	Finland	HIFK (U20 SM-sarja)
3	88	Michael Buchinger	D	Canada	Guelph Storm (OHL)
4	120	Arseni Koromyslov	D	Russia	SKA-Neva (VHL)
5	152	Marc-Andre Gaudet	D	Canada	Chicoutimi Saguenéens (QMJHL)
6	184	Landon Sim	C	Canada	London Knights (OHL)

Notes

1. The Blues traded their second round pick (No. 55) to New York along with Sammy Blais in the trade that brought Pavel Buchnevich to St. Louis. New York then traded the pick conditionally to Winnipeg to acquire forward Andrew Copp.
2. The Blues traded their seventh-round pick (No. 216) to Montreal along with goaltender Jake Allen in exchange for two picks in the 2020 NHL Draft, used to select Dylan Peterson (No. 86) and Noah Beck (No. 194).
3. The Blues acquired a third-round pick (No. 73) from Detroit in exchange for goaltender Ville Husso.
