= 2022–23 Washington Capitals season =

National Hockey League season

2022–23 Washington Capitals
- Division: 6th Metropolitan
- Conference: 13th Eastern
- 2022–23 record: 35–37–10
- Home record: 18–16–7
- Road record: 17–21–3
- Goals for: 255
- Goals against: 265

Team information
- General manager: Brian MacLellan
- Coach: Peter Laviolette
- Captain: Alexander Ovechkin
- Alternate captains: Nicklas Backstrom; John Carlson
- Arena: Capital One Arena
- Average attendance: 18,573
- Minor league affiliates: Hershey Bears (AHL); South Carolina Stingrays (ECHL)

Team leaders
- Goals: Alexander Ovechkin (42)
- Assists: Evgeny Kuznetsov (43)
- Points: Alexander Ovechkin (75)
- Penalty minutes: Tom Wilson (78)
- Plus/minus: Trevor van Riemsdyk (+10)
- Wins: Darcy Kuemper (22)
- Goals against average: Darcy Kuemper (2.87)

The 2022–23 Washington Capitals season was the 49th season for the National Hockey League (NHL) franchise that was established on June 11, 1974. The Capitals missed the playoffs for the first time since the 2013–14 season (and only the second time since 2006–07 and changing their colors back to a more patriotic color scheme), ending their eight-season playoff streak, being eliminated from playoff contention on April 4, 2023, after the Florida Panthers defeated the Buffalo Sabres 2–1. The Capitals ended a streak of 15 consecutive winning seasons, one of twelve NHL teams to ever have a streak that long.

== Standings ==
=== Divisional standings ===
Metropolitan Division
Pos	Team	GP	W	L	OTL	RW	GF	GA	GD	Pts
1	y – Carolina Hurricanes	82	52	21	9	39	266	213	+53	113
2	x – New Jersey Devils	82	52	22	8	39	291	226	+65	112
3	x – New York Rangers	82	47	22	13	37	277	219	+58	107
4	x – New York Islanders	82	42	31	9	36	243	222	+21	93
5	Pittsburgh Penguins	82	40	31	11	31	262	264	−2	91
6	Washington Capitals	82	35	37	10	27	255	265	−10	80
7	Philadelphia Flyers	82	31	38	13	26	222	277	−55	75
8	Columbus Blue Jackets	82	25	48	9	15	214	330	−116	59

Source: National Hockey League
Rules for classification: 1) Fewer number of games played (GP, only during regular season); 2) Greater number of regulation wins (RW); 3) Greater number of wins in regulation and overtime, excluding shootout wins (ROW); 4) Greater number of total wins, including shootouts (W); 5) Greater number of points earned in head-to-head play; if teams played an uneven number of head-to-head games, the result of the first game on the home ice of the team with the extra home game is discarded; 6) Greater goal differential (GD); 7) Greater number of goals scored (GF)
x – Clinched playoff spot; y – Clinched division

=== Conference standings ===
Eastern Conference Wild Card
Pos	Div	Team	GP	W	L	OTL	RW	GF	GA	GD	Pts
1	ME	x – New York Islanders	82	42	31	9	36	243	222	+21	93
2	AT	x – Florida Panthers	82	42	32	8	36	290	273	+17	92
3	ME	Pittsburgh Penguins	82	40	31	11	31	262	264	−2	91
4	AT	Buffalo Sabres	82	42	33	7	30	296	300	−4	91
5	AT	Ottawa Senators	82	39	35	8	31	261	271	−10	86
6	AT	Detroit Red Wings	82	35	37	10	28	240	279	−39	80
7	ME	Washington Capitals	82	35	37	10	27	255	265	−10	80
8	ME	Philadelphia Flyers	82	31	38	13	26	222	277	−55	75
9	AT	Montreal Canadiens	82	31	45	6	21	232	307	−75	68
10	ME	Columbus Blue Jackets	82	25	48	9	15	214	330	−116	59

Source: National Hockey League
Rules for classification: 1) Fewer number of games played (GP, only during regular season); 2) Greater number of regulation wins (RW); 3) Greater number of wins in regulation and overtime, excluding shootout wins (ROW); 4) Greater number of total wins, including shootouts (W); 5) Greater number of points earned in head-to-head play; if teams played an uneven number of head-to-head games, the result of the first game on the home ice of the team with the extra home game is discarded; 6) Greater goal differential (GD); 7) Greater number of goals scored (GF)
x – Clinched playoff spot

== Schedule and results ==
=== Regular season ===
The regular season schedule was released on July 6, 2022.

2022–23 game log
October: 5–4–1 (home: 3–1–0; road: 2–3–1)

Game	Date	Opponent	Score	OT	Decision	Attendance	Record	Points	Recap
1	October 12	Boston Bruins	2–5		Kuemper	18,573	0–1–0	0	
2	October 13	@ Toronto Maple Leafs	2–3		Lindgren	18,914	0–2–0	0	
3	October 15	Montreal Canadiens	3–1		Kuemper	18,573	1–2–0	2	
4	October 17	Vancouver Canucks	6–4		Kuemper	18,573	2–2–0	4	
5	October 20	@ Ottawa Senators	2–5		Kuemper	14,210	2–3–0	4	
6	October 22	Los Angeles Kings	4–3		Kuemper	18,573	3–3–0	6	
7	October 24	@ New Jersey Devils	6–3		Lindgren	11,405	4–3–0	8	
8	October 27	@ Dallas Stars	0–2		Kuemper	18,235	4–4–0	8	
9	October 29	@ Nashville Predators	3–0		Kuemper	17,159	5–4–0	10	
10	October 31	@ Carolina Hurricanes	2–3	SO	Kuemper	16,211	5–4–1	11	

November: 5–7–2 (home: 4–3–1; road: 1–4–1)

Game	Date	Opponent	Score	OT	Decision	Attendance	Record	Points	Recap
11	November 1	Vegas Golden Knights	2–3	OT	Lindgren	18,573	5–4–2	12	
12	November 3	@ Detroit Red Wings	1–3		Kuemper	18,527	5–5–2	12	
13	November 5	Arizona Coyotes	2–3		Kuemper	18,573	5–6–2	12	
14	November 7	Edmonton Oilers	5–4		Lindgren	18,573	6–6–2	14	
15	November 9	Pittsburgh Penguins	1–4		Kuemper	18,573	6–7–2	14	
16	November 11	Tampa Bay Lightning	5–1		Kuemper	18,573	7–7–2	16	
17	November 13	@ Tampa Bay Lightning	3–6		Kuemper	19,092	7–8–2	16	
18	November 15	@ Florida Panthers	2–5		Kuemper	13,813	7–9–2	16	
19	November 17	@ St. Louis Blues	4–5	SO	Lindgren	18,096	7–9–3	17	
20	November 19	Colorado Avalanche	0–4		Kuemper	18,573	7–10–3	17	
21	November 23	Philadelphia Flyers	3–2	OT	Kuemper	18,573	8–10–3	19	
22	November 25	Calgary Flames	3–0		Kuemper	18,573	9–10–3	21	
23	November 26	@ New Jersey Devils	1–5		Lindgren	16,514	9–11–3	21	
24	November 29	@ Vancouver Canucks	5–1		Kuemper	18,179	10–11–3	23	

December: 11–2–2 (home: 5–1–1; road: 6–1–1)

Game	Date	Opponent	Score	OT	Decision	Attendance	Record	Points	Recap
25	December 1	@ Seattle Kraken	2–3	OT	Kuemper	17,151	10–11–4	24	
26	December 3	@ Calgary Flames	2–5		Lindgren	18,698	10–12–4	24	
27	December 5	@ Edmonton Oilers	3–2		Lindgren	17,264	11–12–4	26	
28	December 7	@ Philadelphia Flyers	4–1		Lindgren	16,826	12–12–4	28	
29	December 9	Seattle Kraken	4–1		Lindgren	18,573	13–12–4	30	
30	December 11	@ Winnipeg Jets	5–2		Lindgren	14,096	14–12–4	32	
31	December 13	@ Chicago Blackhawks	7–3		Lindgren	16,181	15–12–4	34	
32	December 15	Dallas Stars	1–2		Lindgren	18,573	15–13–4	34	
33	December 17	Toronto Maple Leafs	5–2		Lindgren	18,573	16–13–4	36	
34	December 19	Detroit Red Wings	4–3	OT	Lindgren	18,573	17–13–4	38	
35	December 22	@ Ottawa Senators	3–2	OT	Kuemper	17,231	18–13–4	40	
36	December 23	Winnipeg Jets	4–1		Lindgren	18,573	19–13–4	42	
37	December 27	@ New York Rangers	4–0		Kuemper	18,006	20–13–4	44	
38	December 29	Ottawa Senators	3–4	OT	Kuemper	18,573	20–13–5	45	
39	December 31	Montreal Canadiens	9–2		Lindgren	18,573	21–13–5	47	

January: 6–7–1 (home: 2–3–1; road: 4–4–0)

Game	Date	Opponent	Score	OT	Decision	Attendance	Record	Points	Recap
40	January 3	Buffalo Sabres	4–5	OT	Kuemper	18,573	21–13–6	48	
41	January 5	@ Columbus Blue Jackets	6–2		Kuemper	17,924	22–13–6	50	
42	January 6	Nashville Predators	2–3		Lindgren	18,573	22–14–6	50	
43	January 8	Columbus Blue Jackets	1–0		Kuemper	18,573	23–14–6	52	
44	January 11	@ Philadelphia Flyers	3–5		Kuemper	17,352	23–15–6	52	
45	January 14	Philadelphia Flyers	1–3		Kuemper	18,573	23–16–6	52	
46	January 16	@ New York Islanders	4–3	OT	Kuemper	16,344	24–16–6	54	
47	January 17	Minnesota Wild	2–4		Lindgren	18,573	24–17–6	54	
48	January 19	@ Arizona Coyotes	4–0		Kuemper	4,600	25–17–6	56	
49	January 21	@ Vegas Golden Knights	2–6		Kuemper	18,251	25–18–6	56	
50	January 24	@ Colorado Avalanche	2–3		Kuemper	18,132	25–19–6	56	
51	January 26	Pittsburgh Penguins	3–2	SO	Kuemper	18,573	26–19–6	58	
52	January 29	@ Toronto Maple Leafs	1–5		Kuemper	18,593	26–20–6	58	
53	January 31	@ Columbus Blue Jackets	4–3	OT	Lindgren	17,879	27–20–6	60	

February: 2–7–0 (home: 1–5–0; road: 1–2–0)

Game	Date	Opponent	Score	OT	Decision	Attendance	Record	Points	Recap
54	February 11	@ Boston Bruins	2–1		Kuemper	17,850	28–20–6	62	
55	February 12	San Jose Sharks	1–4		Lindgren	18,573	28–21–6	62	
56	February 14	Carolina Hurricanes	2–3		Kuemper	18,573	28–22–6	62	
57	February 16	Florida Panthers	3–6		Kuemper	18,573	28–23–6	62	
58	February 18	@ Carolina Hurricanes	1–4		Kuemper	56,961 (outdoors)	28–24–6	62	
59	February 21	Detroit Red Wings	1–3		Kuemper	18,573	28–25–6	62	
60	February 23	Anaheim Ducks	2–4		Lindgren	18,573	28–26–6	62	
61	February 25	New York Rangers	6–3		Kuemper	18,573	29–26–6	64	
62	February 26	@ Buffalo Sabres	4–7		Kuemper	19,070	29–27–6	64	

March: 5–6–3 (home: 2–1–3; road: 3–5–0)

Game	Date	Opponent	Score	OT	Decision	Attendance	Record	Points	Recap
63	March 1	@ Anaheim Ducks	3–2	OT	Kuemper	14,279	30–27–6	66	
64	March 4	@ San Jose Sharks	8–3		Kuemper	17,562	31–27–6	68	
65	March 6	@ Los Angeles Kings	2–4		Kuemper	17,577	31–28–6	68	
66	March 9	New Jersey Devils	2–3	SO	Kuemper	18,573	31–28–7	69	
67	March 11	@ New York Islanders	5–1		Kuemper	17,255	32–28–7	71	
68	March 14	@ New York Rangers	3–5		Kuemper	17,476	32–29–7	71	
69	March 15	Buffalo Sabres	5–4	SO	Lindgren	18,573	33–29–7	73	
70	March 17	St. Louis Blues	2–5		Kuemper	18,573	33–30–7	73	
71	March 19	@ Minnesota Wild	3–5		Lindgren	19,231	33–31–7	73	
72	March 21	Columbus Blue Jackets	6–7	OT	Lindgren	18,573	33–31–8	74	
73	March 23	Chicago Blackhawks	6–1		Kuemper	18,573	34–31–8	76	
74	March 25	@ Pittsburgh Penguins	3–4		Kuemper	18,456	34–32–8	76	
75	March 29	New York Islanders	1–2	SO	Kuemper	18,573	34–32–9	77	
76	March 30	@ Tampa Bay Lightning	1–5		Kuemper	19,092	34–33–9	77	

April: 1–4–1 (home: 1–2–1; road: 0–2–0)

Game	Date	Opponent	Score	OT	Decision	Attendance	Record	Points	Recap
77	April 2	New York Rangers	2–5		Kuemper	18,573	34–34–9	77	
78	April 6	@ Montreal Canadiens	2–6		Kuemper	21,105	34–35–9	77	
79	April 8	Florida Panthers	2–4		Lindgren	18,573	34–36–9	77	
80	April 10	New York Islanders	5–2		Kuemper	18,573	35–36–9	79	
81	April 11	@ Boston Bruins	2–5		Lindgren	17,850	35–37–9	79	
82	April 13	New Jersey Devils	4–5	OT	Kuemper	18,573	35–37–10	80	

Win (2 Points) Loss (0 points) Overtime/shootout loss (1 point)

== Player statistics ==
Final Statistics

=== Skaters ===
Regular season
Player	GP	G	A	Pts	+/−	PIM
Alexander Ovechkin	73	42	33	75	–16	48
Dylan Strome	81	23	42	65	–4	24
Evgeny Kuznetsov	81	12	43	55	–26	56
Erik Gustafsson^{‡}	61	7	31	38	+9	21
Conor Sheary	82	15	22	37	+9	22
T. J. Oshie	58	19	16	35	–18	59
Sonny Milano^{†}	64	11	22	33	–5	18
John Carlson	40	9	20	29	–7	12
Nick Jensen	77	5	24	29	–1	18
Marcus Johansson^{‡}	60	13	15	28	–3	8
Anthony Mantha	67	11	16	27	–8	31
Nic Dowd	65	13	12	25	+6	26
Trevor van Riemsdyk	75	7	16	23	+10	15
Tom Wilson	33	13	9	22	–13	78
Nicklas Backstrom	39	7	14	21	–25	14
Dmitry Orlov^{‡}	43	3	16	19	+2	10
Garnet Hathaway^{‡}	59	9	7	16	+6	52
Lars Eller^{†}	60	7	9	16	–1	36
Martin Fehervary	67	6	10	16	–11	31
Aliaksei Protas	58	4	11	15	–8	12
Rasmus Sandin^{†}	19	3	12	15	–7	16
Nicolas Aube-Kubel^{†}	47	4	8	12	+2	46
Craig Smith^{†}	22	5	1	6	+1	4
Matt Irwin	61	2	3	5	–8	36
Alexander Alexeyev	32	0	5	5	–2	4
Joe Snively	12	2	2	4	+3	0
Beck Malenstyn	9	1	1	2	0	2
Gabriel Carlsson	6	0	2	2	–1	0
Vincent Iorio	3	0	1	1	0	0
Dylan McIlrath	6	0	1	1	–6	7
Connor McMichael	6	0	0	0	0	5
Henrik Borgstrom	1	0	0	0	0	0
Lucas Johansen	2	0	0	0	0	0
Connor Brown	4	0	0	0	–3	0

=== Goaltenders ===
Regular season
Player	GP	GS	TOI	W	L	OT	GA	GAA	SA	SV%	SO	G	A	PIM
Darcy Kuemper	57	56	3,223:47	22	26	7	154	2.87	1.674	.909	5	0	0	4
Charlie Lindgren	31	26	1,692:04	13	11	3	86	3.05	853	.899	0	0	1	0

^{†}Denotes player spent time with another team before joining the Capitals. Stats reflect time with the Capitals only.
^{‡}No longer with the Capitals.

== Transactions ==
The Capitals have been involved in the following transactions during the 2022–23 season.

Key:

† Contract is entry-level.
‡ Contract initially takes effect in the 2023–24 season.

=== Trades ===
Date	Details		Ref
July 8, 2022	To New Jersey Devils Vitek Vanecek; 2nd-round pick in 2022	To Washington Capitals 2nd-round pick in 2022; 3rd-round pick in 2022	
July 13, 2022	To Ottawa Senators 2nd-round pick in 2024	To Washington Capitals Connor Brown	
February 23, 2023	To Minnesota Wild Dmitry Orlov^{1}	To Washington Capitals Andrei Svetlakov	
February 23, 2023	To Boston Bruins Garnet Hathaway; Andrei Svetlakov	To Washington Capitals Craig Smith; 1st-round pick in 2023; 3rd-round pick in 2024; 2nd-round pick in 2025	
February 28, 2023	To Minnesota Wild Marcus Johansson	To Washington Capitals 3rd-round pick in 2024	
February 28, 2023	To Toronto Maple Leafs Erik Gustafsson; BOS 1st-round pick in 2023	To Washington Capitals Rasmus Sandin	
March 1, 2023	To Colorado Avalanche Lars Eller^{1}	To Washington Capitals 2nd-round pick in 2025	

Notes:

- Washington retains 50% of Orlov's remaining contract.
- Washington retains 31% of Eller's remaining contract.

=== Players acquired ===
Date	Player	Former team	Term	Via	Ref
July 13, 2022	Erik Gustafsson	Chicago Blackhawks	1-year	Free agency	
July 13, 2022	Darcy Kuemper	Colorado Avalanche	5-year	Free agency	
July 13, 2022	Charlie Lindgren	St. Louis Blues	3-year	Free agency	
July 14, 2022	Henrik Borgstrom	Chicago Blackhawks	1-year	Free agency	
July 14, 2022	Dylan Strome	Chicago Blackhawks	1-year	Free agency	
July 20, 2022	Gabriel Carlsson	Columbus Blue Jackets	1-year	Free agency	
October 16, 2022	Sonny Milano	Anaheim Ducks	1-year	Free agency	
November 5, 2022	Nicolas Aube-Kubel	Toronto Maple Leafs		Waivers	
March 2, 2023	Ethen Frank	Hershey Bears (AHL)	1-year‡	Free agency	
March 2, 2023	Hardy Haman Aktell	Vaxjo Lakers HC (SHL)	1-year†‡	Free agency	

=== Players lost ===
Date	Player	New team	Term	Via	Ref
July 13, 2022	Pheonix Copley	Los Angeles Kings	1-year	Free agency	
July 13, 2022	Ilya Samsonov	Toronto Maple Leafs	1-year	Free agency	
July 13, 2022	Justin Schultz	Seattle Kraken	2-year	Free agency	
July 15, 2022	Brian Pinho	New Jersey Devils	1-year	Free agency	
July 24, 2022	Michal Kempny	Seattle Kraken	1-year	Free agency	
August 12, 2022	Johan Larsson	Brynas IF (SHL)	1-year	Free agency	
August 25, 2022	Shane Gersich	Hershey Bears (AHL)	1-year	Free agency	
October 10, 2022	Axel Jonsson-Fjallby	Winnipeg Jets		Waivers	
October 10, 2022	Brett Leason	Anaheim Ducks		Waivers	
June 26, 2023	Henrik Borgstrom	HV71 (SHL)	2-year‡	Free agency	

=== Signings ===
Date	Player	Term	Ref
July 8, 2022	Lucas Johansen	2-year	
July 13, 2022	Marcus Johansson	1-year	
July 14, 2022	Matt Irwin	1-year	
July 15, 2022	Ludwig Persson	3-year†	
July 15, 2022	Alexander Suzdalev	3-year†	
February 3, 2023	Dylan Strome	5-year‡	
February 4, 2023	Sonny Milano	3-year‡	
February 28, 2023	Nick Jensen	3-year‡	
March 1, 2023	Ryan Hofer	3-year†‡	
March 3, 2023	Nicolas Aube-Kubel	1-year‡	
May 1, 2023	Ivan Miroshnichenko	3-year†‡	
May 2, 2023	Alexander Alexeyev	2-year‡	
May 8, 2023	Michael Sgarbossa	2-year‡	

== Draft picks ==
Below are the Washington Capitals' selections at the 2022 NHL entry draft, which was held on July 7 to 8, 2022, at Bell Centre in Montreal.

Round	#	Player	Pos.	Nationality	Team (League)
1	20	Ivan Miroshnichenko	LW	Russia	Omskie Krylia (VHL)
2	37	Ryan Chesley	D	USA	U.S. National Team Development Program (USHL)
3	70	Alexander Suzdalev	LW	Sweden	HV71 (J20 Nationell)
3	85	Ludwig Persson	C	Sweden	Frolunda HC (J20 Nationell)
5	149	Jake Karabela	C	Canada	Guelph Storm (OHL)
6	181	Ryan Hofer	C	Canada	Everett Silvertips (WHL)
7	213	David Gucciardi	D	Canada	Michigan State University (B1G)
