= 2022–23 Montreal Canadiens season =

Season of play of professional ice hockey team

2022–23 Montreal Canadiens
- Division: 8th Atlantic
- Conference: 15th Eastern
- 2022–23 record: 31–45–6
- Home record: 17–21–3
- Road record: 14–24–3
- Goals for: 232
- Goals against: 307

Team information
- General manager: Kent Hughes
- Coach: Martin St. Louis
- Captain: Nick Suzuki
- Alternate captains: Joel Edmundson; Brendan Gallagher
- Arena: Bell Centre
- Average attendance: 21,078
- Minor league affiliates: Laval Rocket (AHL); Trois-Rivières Lions (ECHL)

Team leaders
- Goals: Cole Caufield; Nick Suzuki (26)
- Assists: Nick Suzuki (40)
- Points: Nick Suzuki (66)
- Penalty minutes: Arber Xhekaj (101)
- Plus/minus: Rafael Harvey-Pinard; Mike Matheson (+7)
- Wins: Sam Montembeault (16)
- Goals against average: Sam Montembeault (3.42)

The 2022–23 Montreal Canadiens season was the 114th for the club that was established on December 4, 1909, and their 106th season as a franchise in the National Hockey League (NHL).

Following a 3–2 loss to the Philadelphia Flyers on March 28, 2023, the Canadiens were eliminated from playoff contention for a second consecutive year, marking the first such occurrence for the team since the 2017–18 and 2018–19 seasons.

== Standings ==
=== Divisional standings ===
Atlantic Division
Pos	Team	GP	W	L	OTL	RW	GF	GA	GD	Pts
1	p – Boston Bruins	82	65	12	5	54	305	177	+128	135
2	x – Toronto Maple Leafs	82	50	21	11	42	279	222	+57	111
3	x – Tampa Bay Lightning	82	46	30	6	38	283	254	+29	98
4	x – Florida Panthers	82	42	32	8	36	290	273	+17	92
5	Buffalo Sabres	82	42	33	7	30	296	300	−4	91
6	Ottawa Senators	82	39	35	8	31	261	271	−10	86
7	Detroit Red Wings	82	35	37	10	28	240	279	−39	80
8	Montreal Canadiens	82	31	45	6	21	232	307	−75	68

Source: National Hockey League
Rules for classification: 1) Fewer number of games played (GP, only during regular season); 2) Greater number of regulation wins (RW); 3) Greater number of wins in regulation and overtime, excluding shootout wins (ROW); 4) Greater number of total wins, including shootouts (W); 5) Greater number of points earned in head-to-head play; if teams played an uneven number of head-to-head games, the result of the first game on the home ice of the team with the extra home game is discarded; 6) Greater goal differential (GD); 7) Greater number of goals scored (GF)
p – Clinched Presidents' Trophy; x – Clinched playoff spot

=== Conference standings ===
Eastern Conference Wild Card
Pos	Div	Team	GP	W	L	OTL	RW	GF	GA	GD	Pts
1	ME	x – New York Islanders	82	42	31	9	36	243	222	+21	93
2	AT	x – Florida Panthers	82	42	32	8	36	290	273	+17	92
3	ME	Pittsburgh Penguins	82	40	31	11	31	262	264	−2	91
4	AT	Buffalo Sabres	82	42	33	7	30	296	300	−4	91
5	AT	Ottawa Senators	82	39	35	8	31	261	271	−10	86
6	AT	Detroit Red Wings	82	35	37	10	28	240	279	−39	80
7	ME	Washington Capitals	82	35	37	10	27	255	265	−10	80
8	ME	Philadelphia Flyers	82	31	38	13	26	222	277	−55	75
9	AT	Montreal Canadiens	82	31	45	6	21	232	307	−75	68
10	ME	Columbus Blue Jackets	82	25	48	9	15	214	330	−116	59

Source: National Hockey League
Rules for classification: 1) Fewer number of games played (GP, only during regular season); 2) Greater number of regulation wins (RW); 3) Greater number of wins in regulation and overtime, excluding shootout wins (ROW); 4) Greater number of total wins, including shootouts (W); 5) Greater number of points earned in head-to-head play; if teams played an uneven number of head-to-head games, the result of the first game on the home ice of the team with the extra home game is discarded; 6) Greater goal differential (GD); 7) Greater number of goals scored (GF)
x – Clinched playoff spot

== Schedule and results ==
=== Preseason ===
2022 preseason game log: 0–6–2 (home: 0–5–0; road: 0–1–2)
#	Date	Visitor	Score	Home	OT	Decision	Attendance	Record	Recap
1	September 26	New Jersey	2–1	Montreal		Primeau	19,308	0–1–0
2	September 28	Montreal	0–3	Toronto		Montembeault	17,519	0–2–0
3	September 29	Winnipeg	4–3	Montreal		Primeau	19,544	0–3–0
4	October 1	Montreal	4–5	Ottawa	OT	Primeau	15,878	0–3–1
5	October 3	Toronto	5–1	Montreal		Allen	19,636	0–4–1
6	October 4	Ottawa	5–4	Montreal		Montembeault	19,550	0–5–1
7	October 6^{[a]}	Ottawa	4–3	Montreal		Primeau	1,078	0–6–1
8	October 8^{[a]}	Montreal	2–3	Ottawa	OT	Allen	1,155	0–6–2
Notes:^{a} After being postponed due to the COVID-19 pandemic, two NHL preseason games as part of Kraft Hockeyville saw the puck drop between the Montreal Canadiens and Ottawa Senators on October 6, 2022, at the Steele Community Centre in Gander, Newfoundland and Labrador, and October 8 at the J.K. Irving Centre in Bouctouche, New Brunswick.

=== Regular season ===
The regular season schedule was released on July 6, 2022.

2022–23 game log

October: 5–4–0 (home: 3–2–0; road: 2–2–0)
#	Date	Visitor	Score	Home	OT	Decision	Attendance	Record	Pts	Recap
1	October 12	Toronto	3–4	Montreal		Allen	21,105	1–0–0	2
2	October 14	Montreal	0–3	Detroit		Allen	19,515	1–1–0	2
3	October 15	Montreal	1–3	Washington		Montembeault	18,573	1–2–0	2
4	October 17	Pittsburgh	2–3	Montreal	OT	Montembeault	21,105	2–2–0	4
5	October 20	Arizona	2–6	Montreal		Allen	20,691	3–2–0	6
6	October 22	Dallas	5–2	Montreal		Allen	21,105	3–3–0	6
7	October 25	Minnesota	3–1	Montreal		Allen	20,867	3–4–0	6
8	October 27	Montreal	3–2	Buffalo		Montembeault	12,735	4–4–0	8
9	October 29	Montreal	7–4	St. Louis		Allen	18,096	5–4–0	10

November: 6–6–1 (home: 3–4–0; road: 3–2–1)
#	Date	Visitor	Score	Home	OT	Decision	Attendance	Record	Pts	Recap
10	November 1	Montreal	1–4	Minnesota		Allen	16,385	5–5–0	10
11	November 3	Montreal	2–3	Winnipeg	OT	Montembeault	13,729	5–5–1	11
12	November 5	Vegas	6–4	Montreal		Allen	21,105	5–6–1	11
13	November 8	Montreal	3–2	Detroit	SO	Allen	17,033	6–6–1	13
14	November 9	Vancouver	2–5	Montreal		Montembeault	21,105	7–6–1	15
15	November 12	Pittsburgh	4–5	Montreal	OT	Allen	21,105	8–6–1	17
16	November 15	New Jersey	5–1	Montreal		Allen	20,753	8–7–1	17
17	November 17	Montreal	4–6	Columbus		Montembeault	14,914	8–8–1	17
18	November 19	Philadelphia	4–5	Montreal	SO	Allen	21,105	9–8–1	19
19	November 22	Buffalo	7–2	Montreal		Allen	20,984	9–9–1	19
20	November 23	Montreal	3–1	Columbus		Montembeault	14,197	10–9–1	21
21	November 25	Montreal	3–2	Chicago	SO	Montembeault	16,159	11–9–1	23
22	November 29	San Jose	4–0	Montreal		Allen	21,105	11–10–1	23

December: 4–9–2 (home: 1–3–0; road: 3–6–2)
#	Date	Visitor	Score	Home	OT	Decision	Attendance	Record	Pts	Recap
23	December 1	Montreal	2–1	Calgary		Allen	18,106	12–10–1	25
24	December 3	Montreal	3–5	Edmonton		Allen	18,347	12–11–1	25
25	December 5	Montreal	6–7	Vancouver	OT	Montembeault	18,420	12–11–2	26
26	December 6	Montreal	4–2	Seattle		Allen	17,151	13–11–2	28
27	December 10	Los Angeles	4–2	Montreal		Allen	21,105	13–12–2	28
28	December 12	Calgary	1–2	Montreal	SO	Allen	21,105	14–12–2	30
29	December 14	Montreal	2–3	Ottawa		Montembeault	19,567	14–13–2	30
30	December 15	Anaheim	5–2	Montreal		Allen	21,105	14–14–2	30
31	December 17	Tampa Bay	5–1	Montreal		Allen	21,105	14–15–2	30
32	December 19	Montreal	3–2	Arizona	OT	Montembeault	4,600	15–15–2	32
33	December 21	Montreal	1–2	Colorado	OT	Allen	18,091	15–15–3	33
34	December 23	Montreal	2–4	Dallas		Allen	18,532	15–16–3	33
35	December 28	Montreal	1–4	Tampa Bay		Allen	19,092	15–17–3	33
36	December 29	Montreal	2–7	Florida		Montembeault	19,623	15–18–3	33
37	December 31	Montreal	2–9	Washington		Allen	18,573	15–19–3	33

January: 5–8–1 (home: 4–5–1; road: 1–3–0)
#	Date	Visitor	Score	Home	OT	Decision	Attendance	Record	Pts	Recap
38	January 3	Montreal	3–6	Nashville		Montembeault	17,581	15–20–3	33
39	January 5	NY Rangers	4–1	Montreal		Allen	21,105	15–21–3	33
40	January 7	St. Louis	4–5	Montreal		Allen	21,105	16–21–3	35
41	January 9	Seattle	4–0	Montreal		Montembeault	21,105	16–22–3	35
42	January 12	Nashville	3–4	Montreal		Montembeault	21,105	17–22–3	37
43	January 14	Montreal	1–2	NY Islanders		Montembeault	17,255	17–23–3	37
44	January 15	Montreal	2–1	NY Rangers		Montembeault	18,006	18–23–3	39
45	January 17	Winnipeg	1–4	Montreal		Montembeault	21,105	19–23–3	41
46	January 19	Florida	6–2	Montreal		Montembeault	21,105	19–24–3	41
47	January 21	Toronto	2–3	Montreal	OT	Montembeault	21,105	20–24–3	43
48	January 24	Boston	4–2	Montreal		Montembeault	21,105	20–25–3	43
49	January 26	Detroit	4–3	Montreal	OT	Allen	21,105	20–25–4	44
50	January 28	Montreal	0–5	Ottawa		Montembeault	20,034	20–26–4	44
51	January 31	Ottawa	5–4	Montreal		Allen	21,105	20–27–4	44

February: 6–3–0 (home: 3–1–0; road: 3–2–0)
#	Date	Visitor	Score	Home	OT	Decision	Attendance	Record	Pts	Recap
52	February 11	NY Islanders	3–4	Montreal	OT	Montembeault	21,105	21–27–4	46
53	February 12	Edmonton	2–6	Montreal		Allen	21,105	22–27–4	48
54	February 14	Chicago	0–4	Montreal		Allen	21,105	23–27–4	50
55	February 16	Montreal	2–6	Carolina		Montembeault	18,680	23–28–4	50
56	February 18	Montreal	1–5	Toronto		Allen	19,535	23–29–4	50
57	February 21	Montreal	5–2	New Jersey		Montembeault	14,854	24–29–4	52
58	February 24	Montreal	5–2	Philadelphia		Allen	19,661	25–29–4	54
59	February 25	Ottawa	5–2	Montreal		Montembeault	21,105	25–30–4	54
60	February 28	Montreal	3–1	San Jose		Allen	11,470	26–30–4	56

March: 4–10–2 (home: 2–3–2; road: 2–7–0)
#	Date	Visitor	Score	Home	OT	Decision	Attendance	Record	Pts	Recap
61	March 2	Montreal	2–3	Los Angeles		Allen	16,974	26–31–4	56
62	March 3	Montreal	2–3	Anaheim		Montembeault	14,391	26–32–4	56
63	March 5	Montreal	3–4	Vegas		Allen	18,049	26–33–4	56
64	March 7	Carolina	4–3	Montreal	SO	Allen	21,105	26–33–5	57
65	March 9	NY Rangers	4–3	Montreal	SO	Montembeault	21,105	26–33–6	58
66	March 11	New Jersey	3–1	Montreal		Allen	21,105	26–34–6	58
67	March 13	Colorado	8–4	Montreal		Allen	21,105	26–35–6	58
68	March 14	Montreal	6–4	Pittsburgh		Montembeault	17,185	27–35–6	60
69	March 16	Montreal	5–9	Florida		Allen	17,372	27–36–6	60
70	March 18	Montreal	3–5	Tampa Bay		Montembeault	19,092	27–37–6	60
71	March 21	Tampa Bay	2–3	Montreal		Montembeault	21,105	28–37–6	62
72	March 23	Montreal	2–4	Boston		Allen	17,850	28–38–6	62
73	March 25	Columbus	2–8	Montreal		Montembeault	21,105	29–38–6	64
74	March 27	Montreal	4–3	Buffalo	SO	Allen	16,435	30–38–6	66
75	March 28	Montreal	2–3	Philadelphia		Primeau	18,916	30–39–6	66
76	March 30	Florida	5–2	Montreal		Montembeault	21,105	30–40–6	66

April: 1–5–0 (home: 1–3–0; road: 0–2–0)
#	Date	Visitor	Score	Home	OT	Decision	Attendance	Record	Pts	Recap
77	April 1	Carolina	3–0	Montreal		Montembeault	21,105	30–41–6	66
78	April 4	Detroit	5–0	Montreal		Primeau	21,105	30–42–6	66
79	April 6	Washington	2–6	Montreal		Montembeault	21,105	31–42–6	68
80	April 8	Montreal	1–7	Toronto		Montembeault	19,033	31–43–6	68
81	April 12	Montreal	2–4	NY Islanders		Montembeault	17,255	31–44–6	68
82	April 13	Boston	5–4	Montreal		Montembeault	21,105	31–45–6	68

Legend: Win (2 points) Loss (0 points) Overtime/shootout loss (1 point)

== Player statistics ==
Final stats

=== Skaters ===
Regular season
Player	GP	G	A	Pts	+/−	PIM
Nick Suzuki	82	26	40	66	−13	33
Kirby Dach	58	14	24	38	−2	43
Cole Caufield	46	26	10	36	−10	2
Mike Hoffman	67	14	20	34	−10	28
Mike Matheson	48	8	26	34	+7	33
Josh Anderson	69	21	11	32	−8	72
Jonathan Drouin	58	2	27	29	−18	18
Christian Dvorak	64	10	18	28	−12	6
Rafael Harvey-Pinard	34	14	6	20	+7	10
David Savard	62	3	17	20	−14	40
Jake Evans	54	2	17	19	−5	28
Kaiden Guhle	44	4	14	18	−19	27
Evgenii Dadonov^{‡}	50	4	14	18	−10	16
Sean Monahan	25	6	11	17	−5	16
Jordan Harris	65	4	13	17	−3	26
Jesse Ylonen	37	6	10	16	−11	0
Michael Pezzetta	63	7	8	15	−4	77
Rem Pitlick	46	6	9	15	−15	22
Justin Barron	39	4	11	15	−2	20
Johnathan Kovacevic	77	3	12	15	+3	39
Brendan Gallagher	37	8	6	14	−5	45
Joel Armia	43	7	7	14	−7	22
Alex Belzile	31	6	8	14	0	13
Arber Xhekaj	51	5	8	13	−9	101
Joel Edmundson	61	2	11	13	−29	58
Juraj Slafkovsky	39	4	6	10	−13	33
Denis Gurianov^{†}	23	5	3	8	−7	6
Chris Tierney^{†}	23	1	6	7	−7	4
Chris Wideman	46	0	6	6	−6	81
Anthony Richard	13	3	2	5	+2	6
Lucas Condotta	1	1	0	1	0	0
Sean Farrell	6	1	0	1	−2	0
Joel Teasdale	2	0	1	1	−2	0
Corey Schueneman	7	0	1	1	+1	0
Frederic Allard	3	0	0	0	+2	0
Owen Beck	1	0	0	0	−1	0

=== Goaltenders ===
Regular season
Player	GP	GS	TOI	W	L	OT	GA	GAA	SA	SV%	SO	G	A	PIM
Jake Allen	42	41	2,450:25	15	24	3	145	3.55	1335	.891	1	0	1	2
Sam Montembeault	40	39	2,333:51	16	19	3	133	3.42	1345	.901	0	0	0	0
Cayden Primeau	3	2	138:35	0	2	0	8	3.46	54	.852	0	0	0	0

^{†}Denotes player spent time with another team before joining the Canadiens. Stats reflect time with the Canadiens only.
^{‡}Denotes player was traded mid-season. Stats reflect time with the Canadiens only.
Bold/italics denotes franchise record.

== Suspensions/fines ==
Player	Explanation	Length	Salary	Date issued	Ref
Josh Anderson	Boarding Golden Knights defenceman Alex Pietrangelo	2 games	$59,459.46	November 6, 2022	
Juraj Slafkovsky	Boarding Red Wings forward Matt Luff	2 games	$10,270.28	November 9, 2022	
Mike Matheson	Interference against Panthers forward Eric Staal	N/A	$5,000.00	January 20, 2023	
Nick Suzuki	Cross-checking Panthers forward Anton Lundell	N/A	$2,500.00	March 17, 2023	

== Awards and honours ==
=== Awards ===
Regular season
Player	Award	Awarded	Ref
Nick Suzuki	NHL All-Star Game selection	January 5, 2023	
Nick Suzuki	NHL Second Star of the Week	March 27, 2023	

=== Milestones ===
Regular season
Player	Milestone	Reached	Ref
Kaiden Guhle	1st career NHL game	October 12, 2022	
Jordan Harris	1st career NHL assist	October 12, 2022	
Juraj Slafkovsky	1st career NHL game	October 12, 2022	
Arber Xhekaj	1st career NHL game	October 12, 2022	
Arber Xhekaj	1st career NHL assist 1st career NHL point	October 15, 2022	
Kaiden Guhle	1st career NHL assist 1st career NHL point	October 17, 2022	
Juraj Slafkovsky	1st career NHL goal 1st career NHL point	October 20, 2022	
Arber Xhekaj	1st career NHL goal	October 22, 2022	
Kaiden Guhle	1st career NHL goal	October 27, 2022	
Christian Dvorak	1st career NHL hat-trick	October 29, 2022	
Nick Suzuki	100th career NHL assist	October 29, 2022	
Josh Anderson	400th career NHL game	November 5, 2022	
Joel Armia	400th career NHL game	November 5, 2022	
Johnathan Kovacevic	1st career NHL assist 1st career NHL point	November 9, 2022	
Juraj Slafkovsky	1st career NHL assist	November 17, 2022	
Cole Caufield	100th career NHL game	December 1, 2022	
Johnathan Kovacevic	1st career NHL goal	December 6, 2022	
Anthony Richard	1st career NHL goal 1st career NHL point	December 21, 2022	
Anthony Richard	1st career NHL assist	January 3, 2023	
David Savard	700th career NHL game	January 7, 2023	
Christian Dvorak	400th career NHL game	January 12, 2023	
Kirby Dach	200th career NHL game	January 24, 2023	
Rafael Harvey-Pinard	1st career NHL assist	January 26, 2023	
Owen Beck	1st career NHL game	January 28, 2023	
Alex Belzile	1st career NHL goal	February 12, 2023	
Christian Dvorak	200th career NHL point	February 12, 2023	
Rem Pitlick	100th career NHL game	February 16, 2023	
Mike Matheson	100th career NHL assist	February 21, 2023	
Josh Anderson	200th career NHL point	March 13, 2023	
David Savard	200th career NHL point	March 13, 2023	
Jonathan Drouin	200th career NHL assist	March 14, 2023	
Joel Edmundson	100th career NHL point	March 14, 2023	
Michael Pezzetta	100th career NHL game	March 14, 2023	
Nick Suzuki	200th career NHL point	March 23, 2023	
Rafael Harvey-Pinard	1st career NHL hat-trick	March 25, 2023	
Brendan Gallagher	200th career NHL goal	March 27, 2023	
Sean Farrell	1st career NHL game	March 28, 2023	
Sean Farrell	1st career NHL goal 1st career NHL point	March 30, 2023	
Sam Montembeault	100th career NHL game	April 6, 2023	
Joel Teasdale	1st career NHL game	April 12, 2023	
Lucas Condotta	1st career NHL game 1st career NHL goal 1st career NHL point	April 13, 2023	
Joel Teasdale	1st career NHL assist 1st career NHL point	April 13, 2023	

== Transactions ==
The Canadiens have been involved in the following transactions during the 2022–23 season.

=== Key ===
† Contract is entry-level.
‡ Contract initially takes effect in the 2023-24 season.

=== Trades ===
Date	Details		Ref
July 7, 2022	To New York Islanders Alexander Romanov; 4th-round pick in 2022	To Montreal Canadiens 1st-round pick in 2022	
July 7, 2022	To Chicago Blackhawks NYI's 1st-round pick in 2022; 3rd-round pick in 2022	To Montreal Canadiens Kirby Dach	
July 8, 2022	To Vegas Golden Knights TBL's 4th-round pick in 2022^{1}	To Montreal Canadiens 4th-round pick in 2023	
July 16, 2022	To Pittsburgh Penguins Jeff Petry; Ryan Poehling	To Montreal Canadiens Mike Matheson; 4th-round pick in 2023	
August 18, 2022	To Calgary Flames Future considerations	To Montreal Canadiens Sean Monahan; Conditional 1st-round pick in 2024, 2025, or 2026^{2} Conditional 3rd-round pick in 2025^{3} Conditional 4th-round pick in 2025^{4}	
October 26, 2022	To Chicago Blackhawks Cam Hillis	To Montreal Canadiens Nicolas Beaudin	
February 26, 2023	To Dallas Stars Evgenii Dadonov^{5}	To Montreal Canadiens Denis Gurianov	
March 3, 2023	To Los Angeles Kings Nate Schnarr	To Montreal Canadiens Frederic Allard	
March 3, 2023	To Pittsburgh Penguins Nick Bonino (via SJS)^{6}	To Montreal Canadiens Tony Sund (via SJS); SJS's 5th-round pick in 2024 (via SJS)	
March 3, 2023	To San Jose Sharks Arvid Henrikson (via MTL); PIT's 7th-round pick in 2023 (via PIT); Conditional 5th-round pick in 2024 (via PIT)^{7}	To Montreal Canadiens Tony Sund (via SJS); SJS's 5th-round pick in 2024 (via SJS)	
June 27, 2023	To Colorado Avalanche Gianni Fairbrother; FLA's 1st-round pick in 2023^{8} 2nd-round pick in 2023	To Montreal Canadiens Alex Newhook	

==== Notes ====
1. The Tampa Bay Lightning's fourth-round pick went to the Vegas Golden Knights as the result of a trade on July 8, 2022, that sent a fourth-round pick in 2023 to Montreal in exchange for this pick.
  Montreal previously acquired this pick as the result of a trade on July 24, 2021, that sent Vegas' fourth-round pick in 2021 (126th overall) to Tampa Bay in exchange for this pick.
2. Montreal will have the option to receive Calgary's first-round pick in 2024 if this pick is outside of the top 20. If Montreal declines to exercise this option or Calgary's first-round pick in 2024 is within the top 20, they will receive one of Calgary or Florida's first-round picks in 2025 or 2026. If both Calgary and Florida's first-round picks in 2025 are outside of the top 10, Montreal will receive the earlier of the two. If Calgary's first-round pick in 2025 is in the top 10 and Florida's is outside, Montreal will receive Florida's first-round pick in 2025; if Florida's first-round pick in 2025 is in the top 10 and Calgary's outside, Montreal will receive Calgary's first-round pick in 2025. If both Calgary and Florida's first-round picks in 2025 are within the top 10, Montreal will receive Calgary's first-round pick, unless said pick is the first-overall selection in 2025; if so, Montreal will instead receive the earlier of Calgary or Florida's first-round picks in 2026.
3. Montreal will receive Calgary's third-round pick in 2025 if Calgary's first-round pick in 2025 is the first-overall selection and Florida's first-round pick in 2025 is in the top 10 selections; otherwise no pick will be exchanged.
4. Montreal will receive Calgary's fourth-round pick in 2025 if both Calgary and Florida's first-round selections in 2025 are outside of the top 10, Florida's draft position is better than Calgary's, and the rights to Florida's first-round pick in 2025 are with another team; otherwise no pick will be exchanged.
5. The Canadiens will retain 50% of Dadonov's remaining salary until the end of the current season.
6. The Canadiens will retain 50% of Bonino's remaining salary until the end of the current season.
7. San Jose will receive Pittsburgh's fourth-round pick in 2024 should the Penguins reach the 2023 Eastern Conference final – was not converted from a fifth-round selection when the Penguins were eliminated from playoff contention on April 12, 2023.
8. Montreal previously acquired this pick as the result of a trade on March 16, 2022, that sent Ben Chiarot to Florida in exchange for Ty Smilanic, a conditional fourth-round pick in 2022 and this pick (being conditional at the time of the trade). The condition – Montreal will receive a first-round pick in 2023 if Florida's first-round pick in 2022 is outside of the top 10 – was converted when the Panthers qualified for the 2022 Stanley Cup playoffs on April 3, 2022.

=== Players acquired ===
Date	Player	Former team (League)	Term	Via	Ref
July 13, 2022	Madison Bowey	Vancouver Canucks	1-year	Free agency	
July 13, 2022	Anthony Richard	Nashville Predators	1-year	Free agency	
July 13, 2022	Mitchell Stephens	Detroit Red Wings	1-year	Free agency	
October 8, 2022	Johnathan Kovacevic	Winnipeg Jets		Waivers	
February 23, 2023	Chris Tierney	Florida Panthers		Waivers	

=== Players lost ===
Date	Player	New team (League)	Term	Via	Ref
July 13, 2022	Louie Belpedio	Philadelphia Flyers	1-year	Free agency	
July 13, 2022	Kale Clague	Buffalo Sabres	1-year	Free agency	
July 13, 2022	Laurent Dauphin	Arizona Coyotes	1-year	Free agency	
July 13, 2022	Xavier Ouellet	Pittsburgh Penguins	2-year	Free agency	
July 14, 2022	Jean-Sebastien Dea	Arizona Coyotes	2-year	Free agency	
July 25, 2022	William Lagesson	Carolina Hurricanes	1-year	Free agency	
July 29, 2022	Sami Niku	JYP (Liiga)	1-year	Free agency	
August 12, 2022	Josh Brook	Calgary Wranglers (AHL)	1-year	Free agency	
August 16, 2022	Cedric Paquette	HC Dinamo Minsk (KHL)	1-year	Free agency	
September 8, 2022	Mathieu Perreault			Retirement	
October 25, 2022	Tyler Pitlick	St. Louis Blues	1-year	Free agency	
February 8, 2023	Lukas Vejdemo	Djurgårdens IF (HockeyAllsvenskan)	1-year	Free agency	
May 9, 2023	Frederic Allard	Luleå HF (SHL)	2-year	Free agency	
May 10, 2023	Otto Leskinen	Tappara (Liiga)	2-year	Free agency	
June 5, 2023	Tony Sund	HIFK (Liiga)	1-year	Free agency	

=== Signings ===
Date	Player	Term	Ref
July 11, 2022	Michael Pezzetta	1-year	
July 11, 2022	Corey Schueneman	1-year	
July 13, 2022	Alex Belzile	1-year	
July 13, 2022	Nate Schnarr	1-year	
July 13, 2022	Juraj Slafkovsky	3-year^{†}	
July 13, 2022	Joel Teasdale	1-year	
July 14, 2022	Filip Mesar	3-year^{†}	
July 16, 2022	Rem Pitlick	2-year	
July 18, 2022	Sam Montembeault	2-year	
September 7, 2022	Kirby Dach	4-year	
September 8, 2022	Cayden Primeau	3-year	
October 1, 2022	Jake Allen	2-year^{‡}	
October 4, 2022	Owen Beck	3-year^{†}	
October 5, 2022	Logan Mailloux	3-year^{†}	
October 14, 2022	William Trudeau	3-year^{†}	
February 10, 2023	Jordan Harris	2-year^{‡}	
March 1, 2023	Xavier Simoneau	2-year^{†‡}	
March 15, 2023	Jayden Struble	2-year^{†‡}	
March 26, 2023	Sean Farrell	3-year^{†}	
March 31, 2023	Jakub Dobes	2-year^{†‡}	
June 2, 2023	Michael Pezzetta	2-year^{‡}	
June 5, 2023	Cole Caufield	8-year^{‡}	
June 20, 2023	Sean Monahan	1-year^{‡}	

== Draft picks ==
Below are the Montreal Canadiens' selections at the 2022 NHL entry draft, which was held on July 7–8, 2022, at the Bell Centre in Montreal, Quebec.

Round	#	Player	Pos.	Nationality	Team (League)
1	1	Juraj Slafkovsky	LW	Slovakia	TPS (Liiga)
1	26^{1}	Filip Mesar	RW	Slovakia	HK Poprad (Tipos Extraliga)
2	36	Owen Beck	C	Canada	Mississauga Steelheads (OHL)
2	62^{2}	Lane Hutson	D	United States	U.S. NTDP (USHL)
3	75^{3}	Vinzenz Rohrer	C	Austria	Ottawa 67's (OHL)
3	92^{4}	Adam Engstrom	D	Sweden	Djurgårdens IF (SHL)
4	127^{5}	Cedrick Guindon	LW	Canada	Owen Sound Attack (OHL)
5	130	Jared Davidson	C	Canada	Seattle Thunderbirds (WHL)
6	162	Emmett Croteau	G	Canada	Waterloo Black Hawks (USHL)
7	194	Petteri Nurmi	D	Finland	HPK (Liiga)
7	216^{6}	Miguel Tourigny	D	Canada	Acadie-Bathurst Titan (QMJHL)

=== Notes ===
1. The Calgary Flames' first-round pick went to the Montreal Canadiens as the result of a trade on February 14, 2022, that sent Tyler Toffoli to Calgary in exchange for Tyler Pitlick, Emil Heineman, a fifth-round pick in 2023, and this pick (being conditional at the time of the trade). The condition – Montreal will receive a first-round pick in 2023 along with a fourth-round pick in 2024 should Calgary's first-round pick in 2022 be a top ten selection – was not converted when the Flames qualified for the 2022 Stanley Cup playoffs on April 16, 2022.
2. The Edmonton Oilers' second-round pick went to the Montreal Canadiens as the result of a trade on March 21, 2022, that sent Brett Kulak to Edmonton in exchange for William Lagesson, a seventh-round pick in 2024, and this pick (being conditional at the time of the trade). The condition – Montreal will receive a second-round pick in 2023 should Edmonton qualify for the 2022 Stanley Cup Finals – was not converted following the Oilers' playoff elimination versus the Colorado Avalanche in the Western Conference final on June 6, 2022.
3. The Anaheim Ducks' third-round pick went to the Montreal Canadiens as the result of a trade on July 24, 2021, that sent Chicago's third-round pick in 2021 (76th overall) to Anaheim in exchange for this pick.
4. The Carolina Hurricanes' third-round pick went to the Montreal Canadiens as compensation for not matching an offer sheet from Carolina to restricted free agent Jesperi Kotkaniemi on September 4, 2021.
5. The New York Rangers' fourth-round pick went to the Montreal Canadiens as the result of a trade on March 16, 2022, that sent Ben Chiarot to Florida in exchange for Ty Smilanic, a conditional first-round pick in 2023 and this pick being conditional at the time of the trade. The condition – Montreal will receive the lowest of the Rangers' or Jets' fourth-round pick in 2022. – was converted when the Rangers clinched a spot in the 2022 Stanley Cup playoffs on April 9, 2022, and when the Jets were eliminated from the playoffs on April 20, 2022.
6. The St. Louis Blues' seventh-round pick went to the Montreal Canadiens as the result of a trade on July 24, 2021, that sent a seventh-round pick in 2021 to Arizona in exchange for this pick.
  Arizona previously acquired this pick as the result of a trade on July 22, 2021, that sent future considerations to Philadelphia in exchange for Shayne Gostisbehere, a second-round pick in 2022 and this pick.
  Philadelphia previously acquired this pick as the result of a trade on April 12, 2021, that sent Erik Gustafsson to Montreal in exchange for this pick.
  Montreal previously acquired this pick as the result of a trade on September 2, 2020, that sent Washington's third-round pick and Chicago's seventh-round pick both in 2020 to St. Louis in exchange for Jake Allen and this pick.
