= Pitlick =

Pitlick is a surname. Notable people with the surname include:

- Lance Pitlick (born 1967), American ice hockey player
- Rem Pitlick (born 1997), Canadian-born American ice hockey player
- Tyler Pitlick (born 1991), American ice hockey player
