= Johnathan Kovacevic =

Canadian ice hockey player (born 1997)

- Born: July 12, 1997 (age 29) Hamilton, Ontario, Canada
- Height: 6 ft 5 in (196 cm)
- Weight: 223 lb (101 kg; 15 st 13 lb)
- Position: Defence
- Shoots: Right
- NHL team Former teams: New Jersey Devils; Winnipeg Jets; Montreal Canadiens
- NHL draft: 74th overall, 2017; Winnipeg Jets
- Playing career: 2019–present

Johnathan Kovacevic (born July 12, 1997) is a Canadian professional ice hockey player who is a defenceman for the New Jersey Devils of the National Hockey League (NHL). He was selected in the third round, 74th overall, by the Winnipeg Jets in the 2017 NHL entry draft. Kovacevic has also previously played for the Montreal Canadiens.

== Playing career ==
=== Collegiate ===
Kovacevic joined the Merrimack College Warriors beginning in the 2016–17 season. He would appear in 36 games during his freshman year, tallying 19 points. Thereafter, he was named to the Hockey East All-Academic Team as well as earn his school's rookie of the year honour.

In his sophomore year, Kovacevic played in 34 games and recorded 17 points over that span. He would once again be named to the Hockey East All-Academic team following the season.

Prior to his final campaign with Merrimack, Kovacevic would be named an alternate captain. Contributing four goals in 31 appearances, he was also recognized as team MVP.

Collectively, Kovacevic finished his collegiate career with nine goals and 45 assists in 101 games for the Warriors.

=== Professional ===
==== Winnipeg Jets ====
Kovacevic was drafted by the Winnipeg Jets of the National Hockey League (NHL) in the third round, 74th overall, of the 2017 NHL entry draft.

After leaving Merrimack, Kovacevic signed a two-year entry-level contract with the Jets on March 17, 2019. He made his professional debut with the Jets' American Hockey League (AHL) affiliate, the Manitoba Moose, on April 14, 2019, scoring one goal and registering an assist against the Chicago Wolves.

On August 13, 2021, Kovacevic was re-signed by the Jets to a one-year, two-way contract worth $750,000 at the NHL level. In the following 2021–22 season, Kovacevic was recalled from the Moose and played in his first NHL game with the Jets on January 28, 2022 against the Vancouver Canucks, finishing the game with one shot on goal in 10:21 of ice time.

As a restricted free agent, Kovacevic was re-signed to a three-year contract extension with the Jets on July 22, 2022.

==== Montreal Canadiens ====
After attending the Jets' 2022 training camp in preparation for the 2022–23 season, Kovacevic was placed on waivers during the pre-season. He was claimed the following day by the Montreal Canadiens on October 8, 2022. Acquired by the Canadiens to help with weakness on the right side of the defence corps, Kovacevic made his debut in the season opener versus the Toronto Maple Leafs on October 12 and immediately became a regular part of the lineup. He surpassed his prior NHL appearance total within eight days of his first game. Kovacevic was regularly paired with rookie defenceman Jordan Harris, and drew praise from the coaching staff. On November 14, Canadiens executive Jeff Gorton advised Kovacevic to find regular accommodations in Montreal, indicating that he had found a permanent roster berth for the foreseeable future. He remarked on the occasion that "it gives me a little bit of an idea that they like what they see from me, they want me for a bit of a longer haul. Because when you’re picked up on waivers, you never really know."

On December 6, 2022, Kovacevic scored his first career NHL goal in a 4–2 road victory against the Seattle Kraken.

==== New Jersey Devils ====
Prior to the beginning of the NHL free agency period, Kovacevic was traded to the New Jersey Devils on June 30, 2024 in exchange for a fourth-round selection in the 2026 NHL entry draft. On March 7, 2025, Kovacevic agreed to a five-year, $20 million contract extension with the Devils.

== Personal life ==
Kovacevic's parents are immigrants from the former SFR Yugoslavia. His father, Novica, is from Nikšić, Montenegro, and his mother, Angie, is from Bosnia and Herzegovina.

Kovacevic holds a civil engineering degree from Merrimack College.

== Career statistics ==
			Regular season					Playoffs
Season	Team	League	GP	G	A	Pts	PIM	GP	G	A	Pts	PIM
2014–15	Ottawa Jr. Senators	CCHL	52	5	14	19	20	10	0	3	3	6
2015–16	Ottawa Jr. Senators	CCHL	21	2	8	10	6	—	—	—	—	—
2015–16	Hawkesbury Hawks	CCHL	30	6	20	26	21	10	0	7	7	10
2016–17	Merrimack College	HE	36	3	16	19	30	—	—	—	—	—
2017–18	Merrimack College	HE	34	2	15	17	14	—	—	—	—	—
2018–19	Merrimack College	HE	31	4	14	18	14	—	—	—	—	—
2018–19	Manitoba Moose	AHL	1	1	1	2	2	—	—	—	—	—
2019–20	Manitoba Moose	AHL	45	4	8	12	33	—	—	—	—	—
2020–21	Manitoba Moose	AHL	29	2	12	14	23	—	—	—	—	—
2021–22	Manitoba Moose	AHL	62	11	19	30	45	5	0	0	0	2
2021–22	Winnipeg Jets	NHL	4	0	0	0	2	—	—	—	—	—
2022–23	Montreal Canadiens	NHL	77	3	12	15	39	—	—	—	—	—
2023–24	Montreal Canadiens	NHL	62	6	7	13	42	—	—	—	—	—
2024–25	New Jersey Devils	NHL	81	1	16	17	72	3	0	0	0	2
2025–26	New Jersey Devils	NHL	34	0	8	8	38	—	—	—	—	—
NHL totals			258	10	43	53	193	3	0	0	0	2

== Awards and honours ==
Award	Year	Ref
CCHL
All-Rookie Team	2015	
Third All-Star Team	2016	
College
Hockey East All-Academic Team	2017, 2018, 2019	
