= Dave Tyler Junior Player of the Year Award =

US hockey award

The Dave Tyler Junior Player of the Year Award, formerly known as USA Hockey Junior Player of the Year Award, is presented annually to the most outstanding American-born player in junior ice hockey. Chosen by panel of junior coaches and administrators, criteria for the award also includes having played for a US-based junior team.

The award is named after Dave Tyler, who served on USA Hockey's board of directors for 32 years and played an instrumental role in the development and growth of junior hockey in the United States.

== List of winners ==
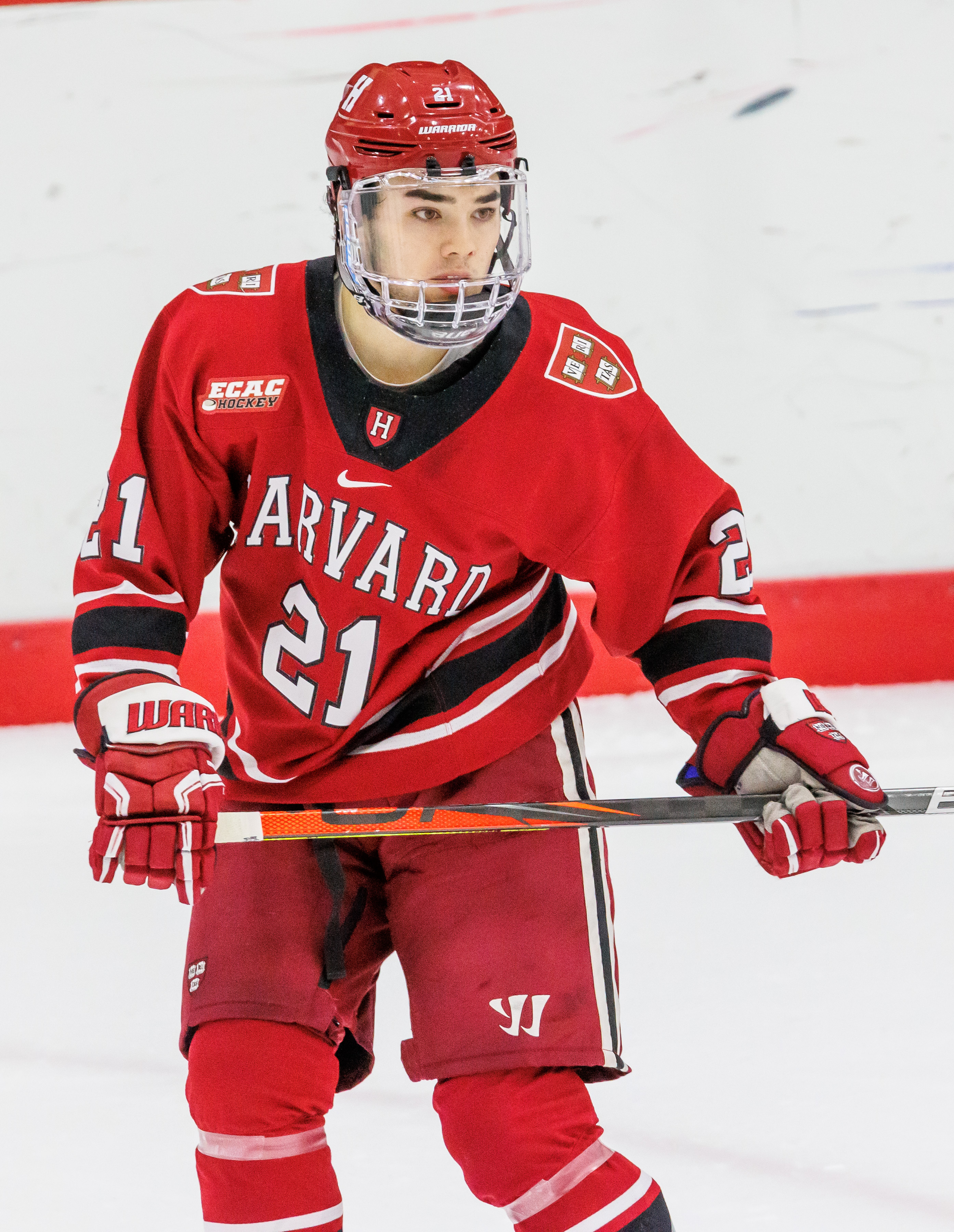
Sean Farrell, 2020–21's Dave Tyler Junior Player of the Year

Season	Name	Team	League
1993–94	Jason Blake	Waterloo Black Hawks	United States Hockey League
1994–95	Ben Henrich	Compuware Ambassadors	North American Hockey League
1995–96	Brian McCullough	Springfield Jr. Blues	North American Hockey League
1996–97	Karl Goehring	Fargo-Moorhead Ice Sharks	United States Hockey League
1997–98	Nate DiCasmirro	North Iowa Huskies	United States Hockey League
1998–99	Peter Fregoe	Des Moines Buccaneers	United States Hockey League
1999–00	Aaron Smith	Green Bay Gamblers	United States Hockey League
2000–01	Chris Fournier	Lincoln Stars	United States Hockey League
2001–02	Greg Rallo	Springfield Jr. Blues	North American Hockey League
2002–03	Ryan Potulny	Lincoln Stars	United States Hockey League
2003–04	Joe Pavelski	Waterloo Black Hawks	United States Hockey League
2004–05	Jeff Lerg	Omaha Lancers	United States Hockey League
2005–06	Trevor Lewis	Des Moines Buccaneers	United States Hockey League
2006–07	Jeff Petry	Des Moines Buccaneers	United States Hockey League
2007–08	Jack Connolly	Sioux Falls Stampede	United States Hockey League
2008–09	Andrew Miller	Chicago Steel	United States Hockey League
2009–10	Matt White	Omaha Lancers	United States Hockey League
2010–11	Blake Coleman	Indiana Ice	United States Hockey League
2011–12	Andy Welinski	Green Bay Gamblers	United States Hockey League
2012–13	Taylor Cammarata	Waterloo Black Hawks	United States Hockey League
2013–14	Tucker Poolman	Omaha Lancers	United States Hockey League
2014–15	Kyle Connor	Youngstown Phantoms	United States Hockey League
2015–16	Rem Pitlick	Muskegon Lumberjacks	United States Hockey League
2016–17	Zach Solow	Dubuque Fighting Saints	United States Hockey League
2017–18	Jack Hughes	Team USA	United States Hockey League
2018–19	Ronnie Attard	Tri-City Storm	United States Hockey League
2019–20	Jake Sanderson	Team USA	United States Hockey League
2020–21	Sean Farrell	Chicago Steel	United States Hockey League
2021–22	Connor Kurth	Dubuque Fighting Saints	United States Hockey League
2022–23	Cole Knuble	Fargo Force	United States Hockey League
