= Jeff Petry =

American ice hockey player (born 1987)

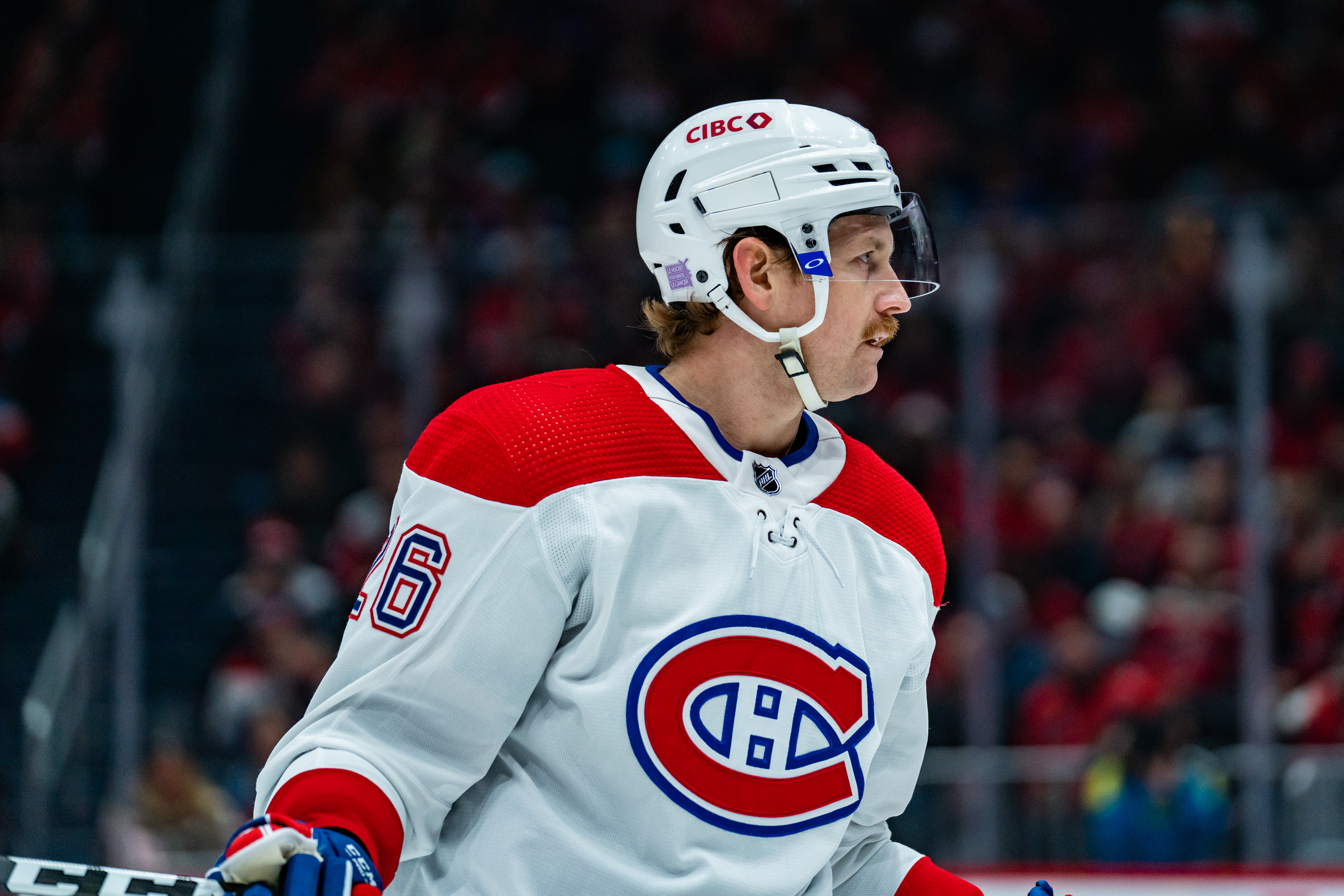
- Petry with the Montreal Canadiens in November 2021
- Born: December 9, 1987 (age 38) Ann Arbor, Michigan, U.S.
- Height: 6 ft 3 in (191 cm)
- Weight: 208 lb (94 kg; 14 st 12 lb)
- Position: Defense
- Shoots: Right
- NHL team Former teams: Free agent Edmonton Oilers; Montreal Canadiens; Pittsburgh Penguins; Detroit Red Wings; Florida Panthers; Minnesota Wild
- National team: United States
- NHL draft: 45th overall, 2006; Edmonton Oilers
- Playing career: 2010–present

Jeffrey Petry (/ˈpiːtriː/ PEE-tree; born December 9, 1987) is an American professional ice hockey player who is a defenseman and current unrestricted free agent. He most recently played for the Minnesota Wild of the National Hockey League (NHL).

He was selected in the second round, 45th overall, by the Edmonton Oilers in the 2006 NHL entry draft, playing for the organization from 2010 until being traded to the Montreal Canadiens in 2015. Petry has also previously played for the Pittsburgh Penguins, Detroit Red Wings, and Florida Panthers.

== Playing career ==
=== Amateur ===
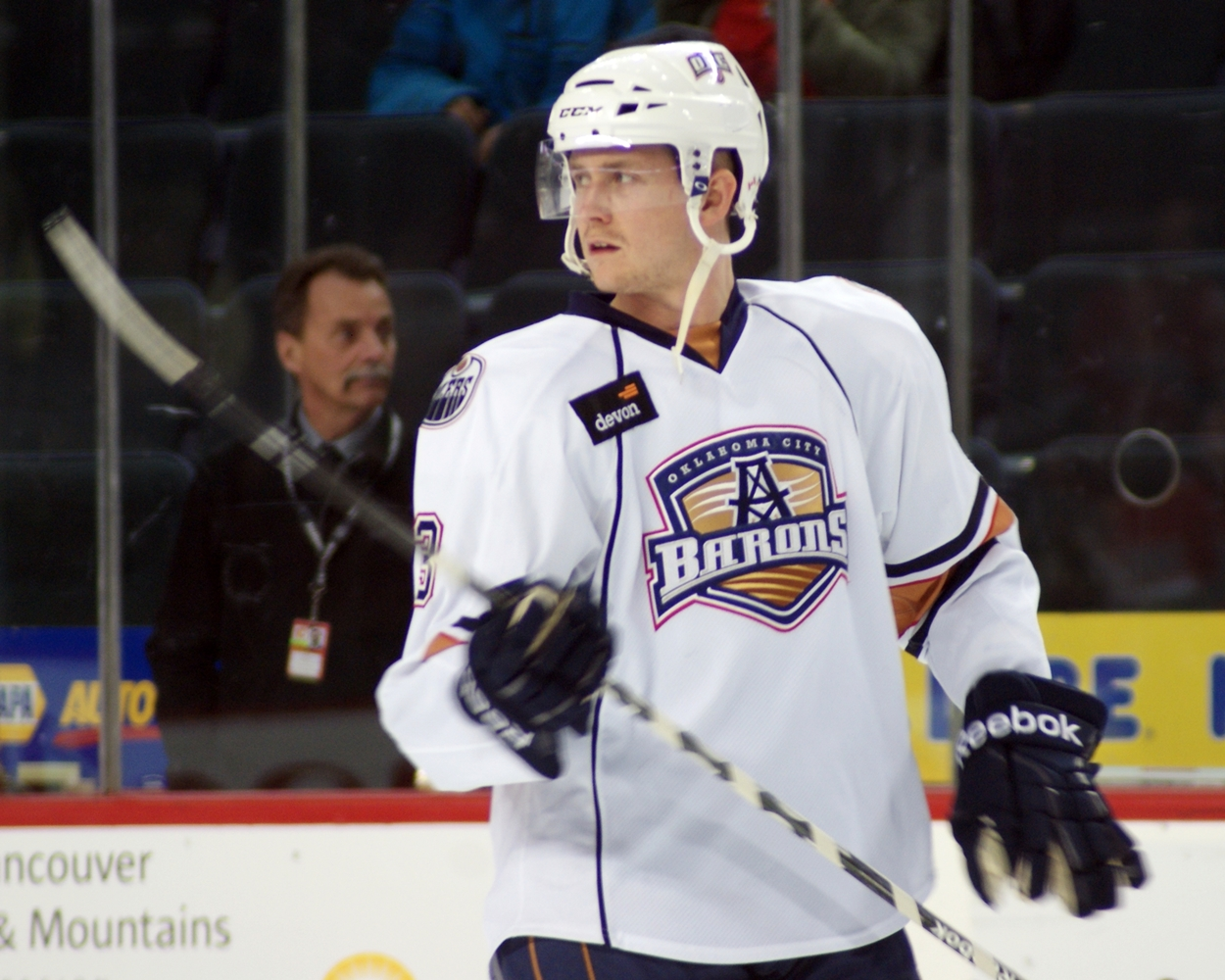
Petry in February 2011.

Born in Ann Arbor, Michigan, and raised in Farmington Hills, Michigan, Petry spent three years playing varsity hockey at St. Mary's Preparatory, in nearby Orchard Lake Village. He left prior to his senior season in November 2005 to play for the Des Moines Buccaneers of the United States Hockey League (USHL), a member of the team's 2006 Tier 1 National Championship-winning team.

Petry was then drafted by the Edmonton Oilers of the NHL in the second round of the 2006 NHL entry draft, 45th overall. He was the Oilers' highest draft pick that year, as the Oilers had previously traded their first-round pick to the Minnesota Wild in exchange for goaltender Dwayne Roloson. Petry would play the following season with the Buccaneers, once again helping the team reach the playoffs.

In 2007, Petry accepted a scholarship with Michigan State University. He registered 24 points (three goals and 21 assists) and was named to the Central Collegiate Hockey Association (CCHA) All-Rookie Team in his freshman year. The following season for Petry saw a drop in performance, as he was held to a total of 14 points (two goals and 12 assists). He achieved a significant improvement to his game for his junior year at Michigan State, however, as he finished third overall in team scoring and first as a defenseman, collecting 29 points (four goals and 25 assists).

Petry was ever-present for his team, playing in all the Spartans' games for the three seasons he was there.

=== Professional ===
==== Edmonton Oilers (2010–2015) ====
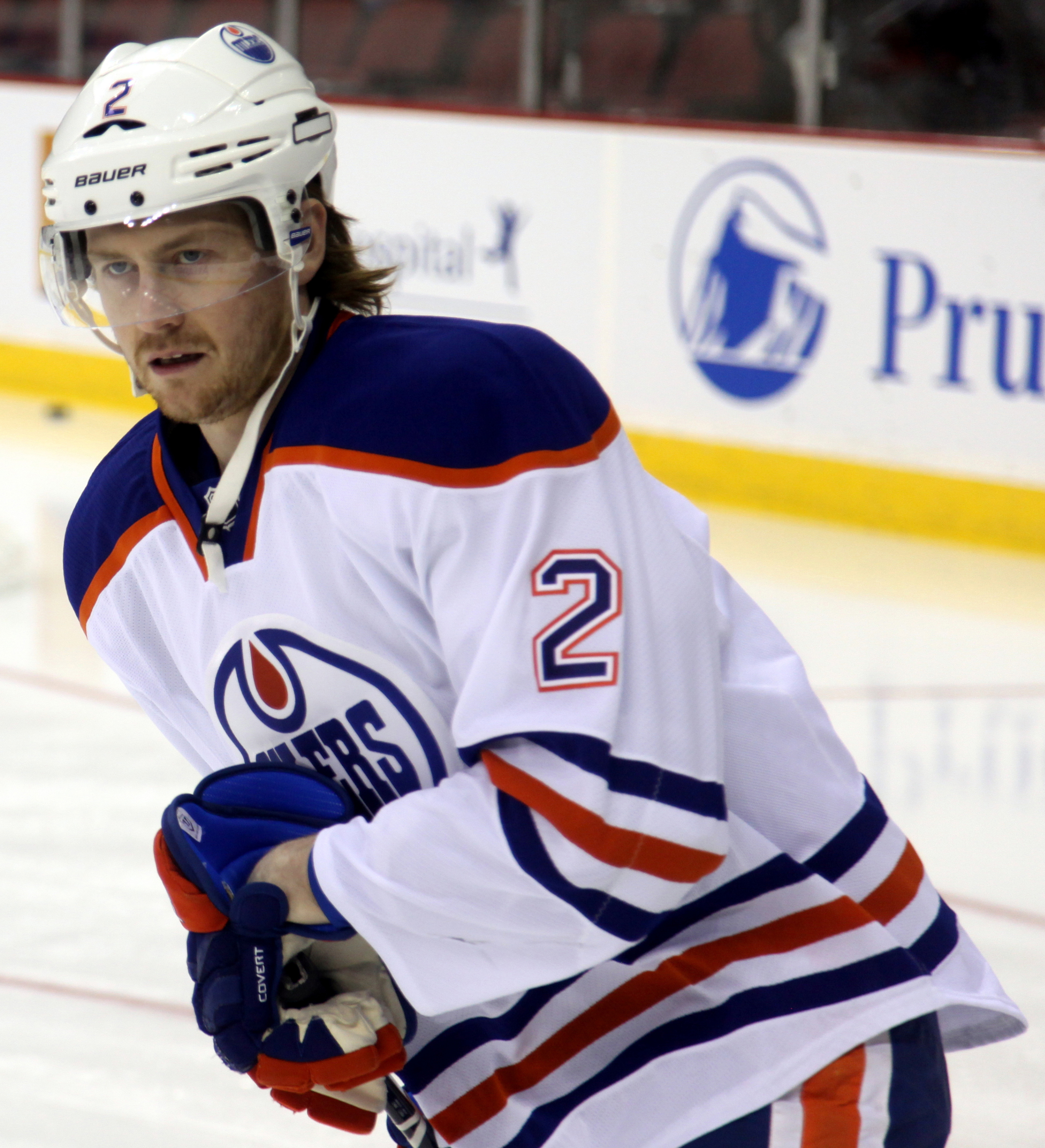
Petry with the Edmonton Oilers in February 2014.

Upon completing what would be his final year at collegiate level, Petry signed a two-year, entry-level contract with the Edmonton Oilers on March 10, 2010. He was then briefly assigned to the Oilers' then-American Hockey League (AHL) affiliate, the Springfield Falcons, playing in eight games. He played his first game as a professional on March 26.

On September 30, 2010, Petry was assigned by the Oilers to their new AHL affiliate, the Oklahoma City Barons, for its inaugural season. On December 27, Edmonton recalled Petry from Oklahoma City. He then made his NHL debut against the Buffalo Sabres on December 28, 2010, and recorded his first NHL point, a secondary assist on a goal by Ryan Jones. His first NHL goal was scored on January 20, 2011, against Kari Lehtonen of the Dallas Stars. On February 4, 2011, Petry was reassigned back to the Barons.

Petry improved in his second NHL season, leading all Oilers defensemen in points, with 25, and was trusted into a shutdown role alongside Ladislav Šmíd. At the end of the 2011–12 season, on June 7, 2012, Petry re-signed on a two-year, $3.4 million contract with the Oilers.

At the start of the 2011–12 season, Petry made Edmonton's NHL roster out of training camp and subsequently played three regular season games before being assigned to Oklahoma City. After only two games in the AHL, however, Petry was recalled back to Edmonton, where he remained for the entire season, playing in 73 games.

After the Oilers missed the playoffs in 2012, Petry was invited to play for Team USA at the 2012 IIHF World Championship. He amassed six points in nine games, though the United States were eliminated in the quarter-finals by Finland. Petry stayed as a permanent member of the Oilers for the lockout-shortened 2012–13 season, playing in all 48 games as the Oilers again failed to make the Stanley Cup playoffs that year.

==== Montreal Canadiens (2015–2022) ====
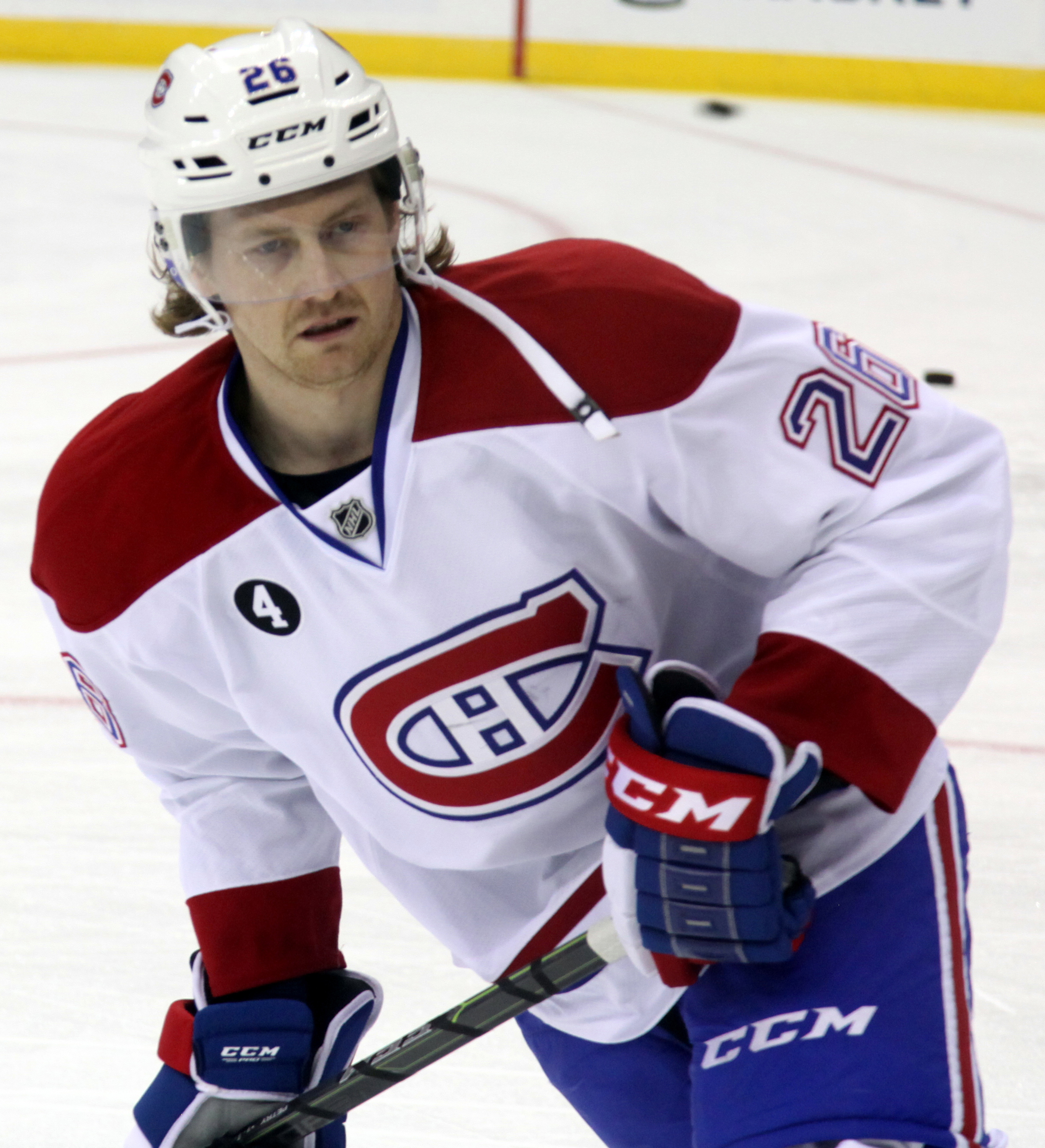
Petry with the Montreal Canadiens in April 2015.

On March 2, 2015, during the 2014–15 season, Petry was traded to the Montreal Canadiens in exchange for a 2015 second-round draft pick and conditional fifth-round pick. After the Canadiens post-season run, on June 2, 2015, Petry opted to surrender his impending free agent status in signing a six-year contract extension with the Montreal Canadiens until the 2020–21 season.

On September 25, 2020, Petry signed a four-year, $25 million contract extension with the Canadiens.

The 2020–21 COVID-shortened season proved to be Petry's most productive to date, while playing alongside Montreal newcomer Joel Edmundson. His 42 points over 55 games was second on the team, behind only Tyler Toffoli. Petry participated in the Canadiens' deep run during the 2021 Stanley Cup playoffs, culminating in an appearance in the 2021 Stanley Cup Finals, where they lost to the Tampa Bay Lightning in five games. Petry sustained a finger injury in the course of Game 3 of the second round series against the Winnipeg Jets, causing him to miss two games. He opted against surgery to remain in the series, instead having it put in a cast, the pain from which caused blood vessels in both his eyes to pop, and he returned to Game 2 of the semi-final against the Vegas Golden Knights with noticeably bloodshot eyes that became an internet meme.

With Shea Weber's departure from the lineup for health reasons, Petry became the Canadiens' top defenseman going into the 2021–22 season. Expectations were high based on four consecutive forty point seasons, but Petry's struggles became one of the most prominent features of a historically poor start for the team. In his first 25 games, Petry recorded only 2 secondary assists, and committed numerous miscues that attracted commentator and fan speculation that he was attempting to play through injury. His poor play lead fans of the team to derisively dub him the "Tank Commander". In December, shortly after the sacking of longtime general manager Marc Bergevin, the team announced that Petry was dealing with an upper body injury and would miss an undetermined number of upcoming games. The change in management with the hiring of Jeff Gorton and possibility of the Canadiens initiating a long-term rebuild raised questions about whether Petry would seek a trade. He said "when you get later in your career — as a I am — you know time's not on your side. So that's a decision that they need to make and to be aware of what they're going to do." Petry was vocally critical of coach Dominique Ducharme. His situation became more complicated still when his wife Julie became frustrated with the Quebec government's pandemic measures and relocated with their children to Detroit for the remainder of the season.

Following Ducharme's sacking by new general manager Kent Hughes and the hiring of Martin St. Louis to replace him, Petry's play markedly improved. However, he remained interested in a trade for family reasons. Hughes attempted to facilitate one at the trade deadline, but none took shape, and he said that he would attempt again in the summer. Petry subsequently sustained a lower body injury in a March 24 game against the Florida Panthers, exiting in the third period, and was announced as being out indefinitely. After returning, he played what was widely judged as his best hockey of the season in the final weeks of April, including a two-goal performance to help the team beat the New York Rangers 4–3, snapping a nine-game losing streak in the penultimate game of the year.

==== Pittsburgh Penguins (2022–2023) ====
On July 16, 2022, Petry, along with forward Ryan Poehling, was traded to the Pittsburgh Penguins in exchange for Mike Matheson and a 2023 fourth-round draft pick. Having been acquired by general manager Ron Hextall in the hopes that he would improve the offensive performance of the Penguins' blueline, there was a general sense of disappointment with Petry's first season with the team, despite generating 31 points in 61 games. He missed time with injury, and in the midst of an underwhelming season for the Penguins that saw them miss the playoffs for the first time in 17 years, there were reports that new general manager Kyle Dubas was looking to trade Petry elsewhere.

==== Detroit Red Wings (2023–2025) ====
On August 6, 2023, Petry, alongside Casey DeSmith, Nathan Legare, and a 2025 second-round pick, was traded back to Montreal in exchange for Rem Pitlick and Mike Hoffman as part of a three-team trade also involving the San Jose Sharks. It was widely speculated that general manager Hughes would seek to immediately trade Petry to another team; as a result, Petry was again traded to the Detroit Red Wings in exchange for Gustav Lindström and a conditional 2025 fourth-round pick on August 15. During the 2024–25 season, he recorded one goal and seven assists in 44 games for the Red Wings.

==== Florida Panthers (2025–2026) ====
On July 1, 2025, Petry signed as a free agent to a one-year, $775,000 contract with the Florida Panthers for the 2025–26 season. On November 17, 2025, Petry played his 1,000th NHL game, becoming the 413th player to reach the mark.

==== Minnesota Wild (2026–present) ====
As a pending free agent, Petry was traded to the Minnesota Wild on March 5, 2026, in exchange for a conditional 2026 seventh-round pick.

== Personal life ==
Petry is a second-generation professional athlete. His father, Dan Petry, is a former Major League Baseball (MLB) pitcher who earned a World Series ring as a member of the Detroit Tigers in 1984. Petry has an older brother, Matt. He and his wife Julie have four sons.

== International play ==
Medal record

Men's ice hockey

Representing the United States

World Championships
Bronze medal – third place	2013 Sweden/Finland	

Petry represented the United States at the 2013 World Championship where he was scoreless in 10 games and won a bronze medal.

== Career statistics ==
=== Regular season and playoffs ===
			Regular season					Playoffs
Season	Team	League	GP	G	A	Pts	PIM	GP	G	A	Pts	PIM
2004–05	St. Mary's Preparatory	HSMI	23	2	8	10	—	6	2	5	7	—
2005–06	Detroit Little Caesars	MWEHL	33	7	21	28	24	—	—	—	—	—
2005–06	Des Moines Buccaneers	USHL	48	1	14	15	68	11	2	5	7	8
2006–07	Des Moines Buccaneers	USHL	55	18	27	45	71	8	0	6	6	10
2007–08	Michigan State University	CCHA	42	3	21	24	28	—	—	—	—	—
2008–09	Michigan State University	CCHA	38	2	12	14	32	—	—	—	—	—
2009–10	Michigan State University	CCHA	38	4	25	29	26	—	—	—	—	—
2009–10	Springfield Falcons	AHL	8	0	3	3	2	—	—	—	—	—
2010–11	Oklahoma City Barons	AHL	41	7	17	24	18	6	0	1	1	5
2010–11	Edmonton Oilers	NHL	35	1	4	5	10	—	—	—	—	—
2011–12	Oklahoma City Barons	AHL	2	0	1	1	2	—	—	—	—	—
2011–12	Edmonton Oilers	NHL	73	2	23	25	26	—	—	—	—	—
2012–13	Edmonton Oilers	NHL	48	3	9	12	29	—	—	—	—	—
2013–14	Edmonton Oilers	NHL	80	7	10	17	42	—	—	—	—	—
2014–15	Edmonton Oilers	NHL	59	4	11	15	32	—	—	—	—	—
2014–15	Montreal Canadiens	NHL	19	3	4	7	10	12	2	1	3	4
2015–16	Montreal Canadiens	NHL	51	5	11	16	16	—	—	—	—	—
2016–17	Montreal Canadiens	NHL	80	8	20	28	22	6	1	0	1	2
2017–18	Montreal Canadiens	NHL	82	12	30	42	28	—	—	—	—	—
2018–19	Montreal Canadiens	NHL	82	13	33	46	28	—	—	—	—	—
2019–20	Montreal Canadiens	NHL	71	11	29	40	26	10	2	1	3	6
2020–21	Montreal Canadiens	NHL	55	12	30	42	20	20	0	6	6	6
2021–22	Montreal Canadiens	NHL	68	6	21	27	36	—	—	—	—	—
2022–23	Pittsburgh Penguins	NHL	61	5	26	31	24	—	—	—	—	—
2023–24	Detroit Red Wings	NHL	73	3	21	24	39	—	—	—	—	—
2024–25	Detroit Red Wings	NHL	44	1	7	8	16	—	—	—	—	—
2025–26	Florida Panthers	NHL	58	0	8	8	22	—	—	—	—	—
2025–26	Minnesota Wild	NHL	9	0	1	1	2	3	0	0	0	0
NHL totals			1,048	96	298	394	428	51	5	8	13	18

=== International ===
Year	Team	Event	Result	GP	G	A	Pts	PIM
2012	United States	WC	7th	9	2	3	5	4
2013	United States	WC	3rd place, bronze medalist(s)	10	0	0	0	4
2014	United States	WC	6th	8	0	4	4	4
2024	United States	WC	5th	7	0	1	1	0
Senior totals				34	2	9	11	12

== Awards and honors ==
Award	Year
USHL
Clark Cup champion	2005–06
All-Star	2005–06, 2006–07
Defenseman of the Year	2006–07
First All-Star Team	2006–07
Dave Tyler Junior Player of the Year Award	2006–07
College
All-CCHA Rookie Team	2007–08
CCHA Rookie of the Year Finalist	2007–08
NCAA West All-Tournament Team	2007–08
INCH Freshman All-American	2007–08
All-CCHA Second Team	2009–10
AHCA West Second-Team All-American	2009–10
