= Trevor Lewis =

American ice hockey player (born 1987)

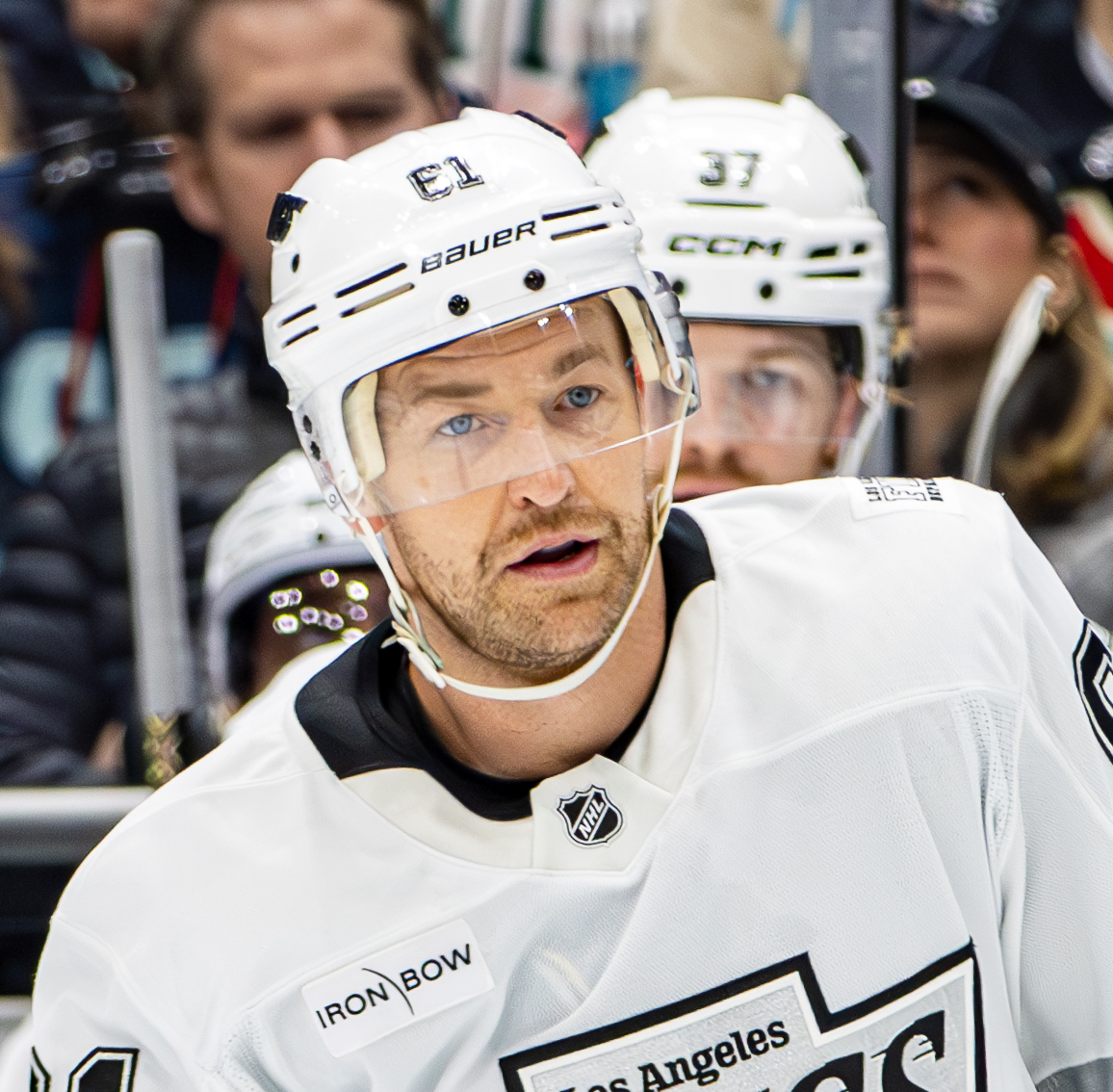
- Lewis with the Los Angeles Kings in 2025
- Born: January 8, 1987 (age 39) Salt Lake City, Utah, U.S.
- Height: 6 ft 1 in (185 cm)
- Weight: 200 lb (91 kg; 14 st 4 lb)
- Position: Center
- Shot: Right
- Played for: Los Angeles Kings; Winnipeg Jets; Calgary Flames
- National team: United States
- NHL draft: 17th overall, 2006; Los Angeles Kings
- Playing career: 2007–2026

Trevor Lewis (born January 8, 1987) is an American former professional ice hockey player who played 17 seasons in the National Hockey League (NHL). Lewis appeared in parts of 12 seasons with the Los Angeles Kings after being drafted 17th overall by the team in the 2006 NHL entry draft; he spent one season with the Winnipeg Jets before signing with the Calgary Flames in 2021. He won Stanley Cup championships with the Kings in 2012 and 2014.

== Early life ==
Lewis was born and raised in Salt Lake City, on January 8, 1987, to Canadian parents Randy and Linda. Lewis began skating at the age of two and played organized hockey by the age of five. Due to the low popularity of ice hockey in Salt Lake, Lewis often played on youth teams with only 12 players. He played on youth hockey teams in the Salt Lake Valley and spent a year on Brighton High School's hockey team. As a freshman in 2002, Lewis was the Brighton Bengals leading goal scorer and helped the team qualify for the State championships. After one year at Brighton, Lewis moved to Colorado Springs, Colorado to play for the Pike's Peak Miners AAA team to gain more attention from scouts. In his first season with the Miners, Lewis recorded 35 goals and 22 assists. He doubled this output in his second season with the team and finished with 118 points in 70 games.

== Playing career ==
=== Junior ===
At the age of 16, Lewis was drafted by Cedar Rapids RoughRiders of the United States Hockey League (USHL) but failed to make the team. As such, he moved to Texarkana to play in the North American Hockey League. However, before the season started, Lewis was offered the chance to play with the Des Moines Buccaneers in the USHL and he immediately moved to join the team. In his first season with the Buccaneers, Lewis finished eighth in team scoring with 22 points. During the 2005 offseason, Lewis worked out more to improve his play. He significantly improved the following year and was named the USHL Player and Forward of the Year after recording 35 goals and 40 assists. As a result, Lewis was selected for the USHL All-Star Game and finished second in the fastest skater competition. During the 2006 USHL playoffs, Lewis recorded two goals and nine assists en route to the USHL Clark Cup Finals. He was also honored with the Curt Hammer Award as the USHL's most gentlemanly player and was selected for the 2005–06 All-USHL first team.

As a result of his sophomore season, Lewis also began to earn attention from NHL and college scouts. His head coach in Iowa estimated he received around 100 phone calls from colleges enquiring about Lewis. Leading up to the NHL entry draft, Lewis was ranked 77th by The Hockey News. He was expected to be drafted late in the first round or second round. After the Los Angeles Kings made a last-minute trade, they drafted him in the first round, 17th overall, in the 2006 NHL entry draft. Although he had originally committed to play college hockey at the University of Michigan, Lewis chose to forgo post-secondary education and start his career by signing a three-year, entry-level contract with the Kings. Following the draft, it was revealed that the Owen Sound Attack of the Ontario Hockey League (OHL) had signed Lewis to a contract during the NHL draft combine, despite his junior playing rights being owned by the Western Hockey League due to him being born in Utah. While the WHL tried to dispute this signing the Canadian Hockey League's board of governors ruled in favor of Owen Sound. Lewis subsequently joined the Owen Sound Attack for the 2006–07 season, where he recorded 73 points through 62 games.

=== Los Angeles Kings (2008–2020) ===
After the Owen Sound Attack were eliminated from the 2007 OHL playoffs, Lewis signed an amateur tryout agreement with the Kings' American Hockey League (AHL) affiliate, the Manchester Monarchs, to end the season. He recorded four goals and two assists over the final eight games of the regular season. Although he played two games with the Monarchs in the 2007 Calder Cup playoffs, he failed to record a point.

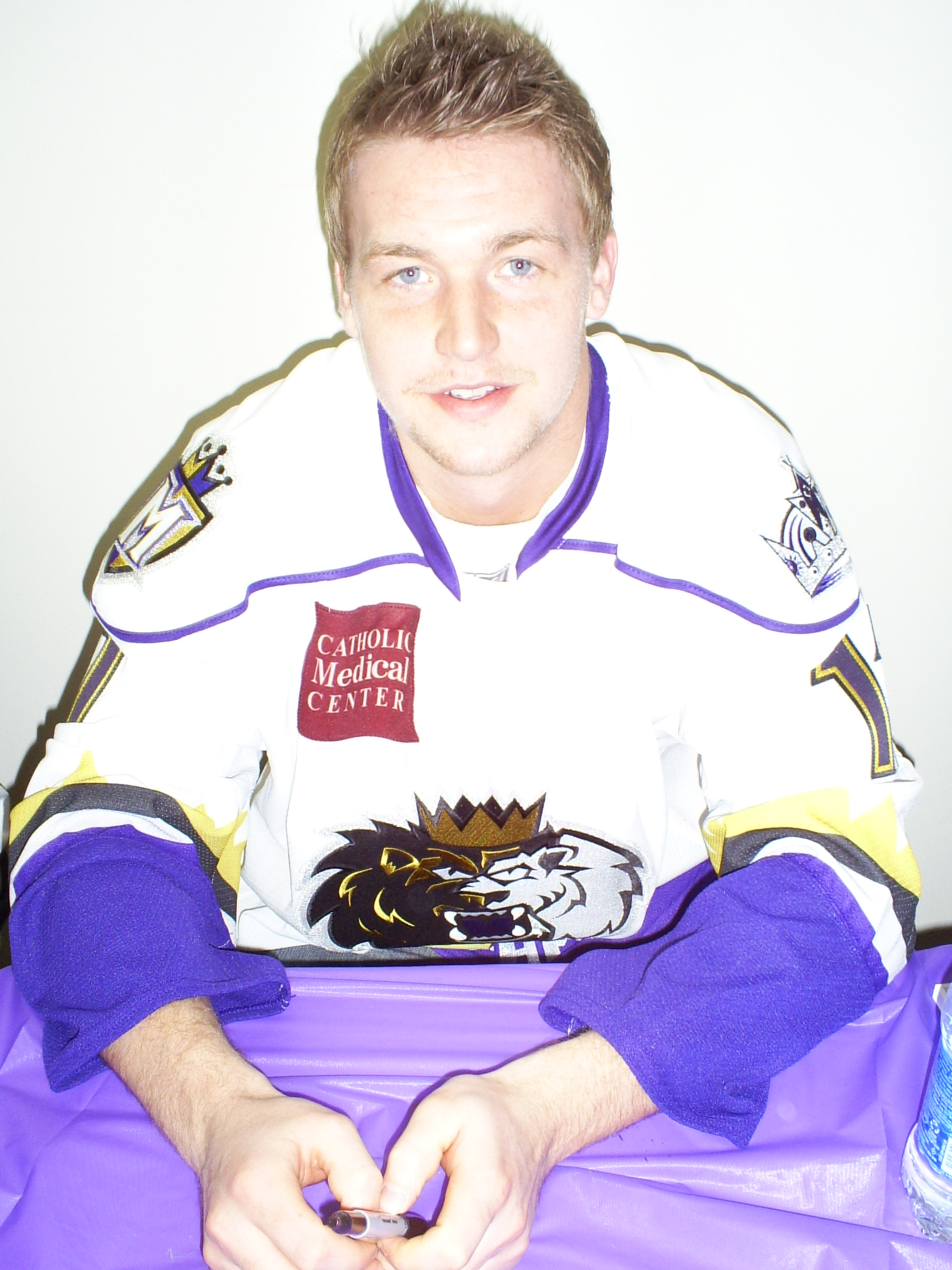
Lewis in 2009

Lewis participated in the Kings 2008 training camp before being re-assigned to the Monarchs to start the 2008–09 season. Following a game against the Manitoba Moose on December 17, Lewis was informed he was called up to the NHL level. At the time of the recall, Lewis had recorded eight goals and 11 assists for 19 points over 28 games. He met the Kings in Buffalo and made his NHL debut on December 19, 2008. Lewis scored his first NHL goal the following day, on December 20, in a 6–4 loss to the Detroit Red Wings. He played four more games with the Kings and added two assists before being returned to Monarchs on December 30. This would be his only recall of the season. He finished the 2008–09 regular season with 20 goals and 31 assists for the Monarchs.

After participating in the Kings' 2009 training camp, Lewis was named to their opening night roster for the 2009–10 season. He went pointless over five games, and served as a healthy scratch for another four, before being re-assigned to the Monarchs on December 30, 2009. This would be his only time spent at the NHL level for the remainder of the season. Lewis was again named to the King's opening roster to start the 2010–11 season and replaced his old jersey number with number 22. He tallied a career-high three goals and 10 assists through 72 games. On July 15, 2011, Lewis signed a two-year extension with the Kings worth $1.45 million.

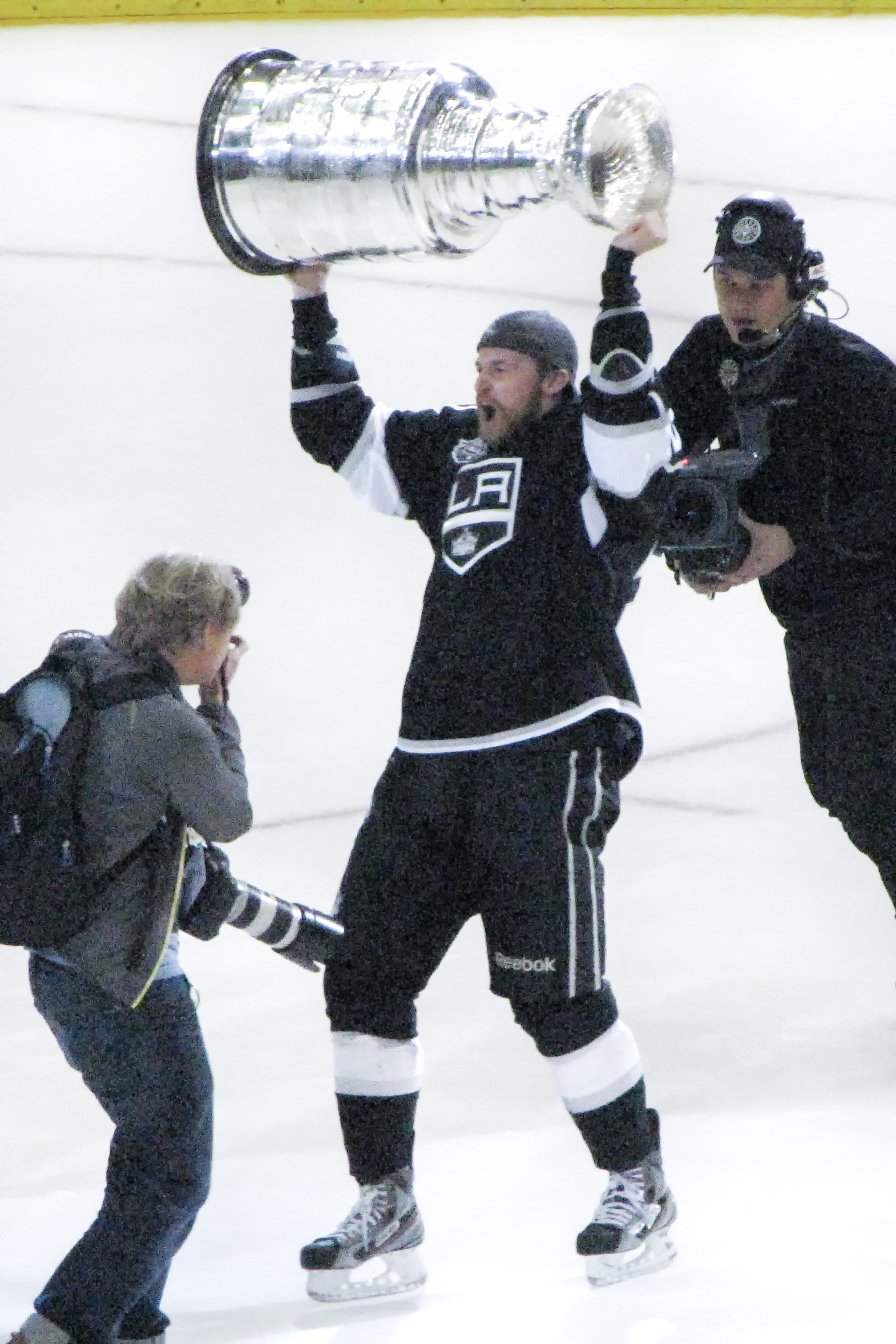
Lewis hoisting the Stanley Cup after the 2012 Stanley Cup Final

In the first year of his new contract, Lewis helped the Kings win their first Stanley Cup championship in franchise history. He scored two goals in the clinching game six.

Lewis signed another two-year extension with the Kings on April 8, 2014, before helping the Kings to their second Stanley Cup.

Lewis signed a four-year contract extension with the Kings on June 25, 2016. In the 2016–17 season, Lewis scored 12 goals and assists for 24 points and played a full 82 games for the first time in his career.

During the 2017–18 season, Lewis put up a career-high 26 points despite being placed on injured reserve in February 2018. After appearing in 17 games for the Kings during the 2018–19 season, and recording three points, Lewis was again placed on injured reserve due to a lower-body injury. He was activated off injured reserve on February 9, 2019, after missing 37 games.

=== Winnipeg Jets and Calgary Flames (2021–2023) ===
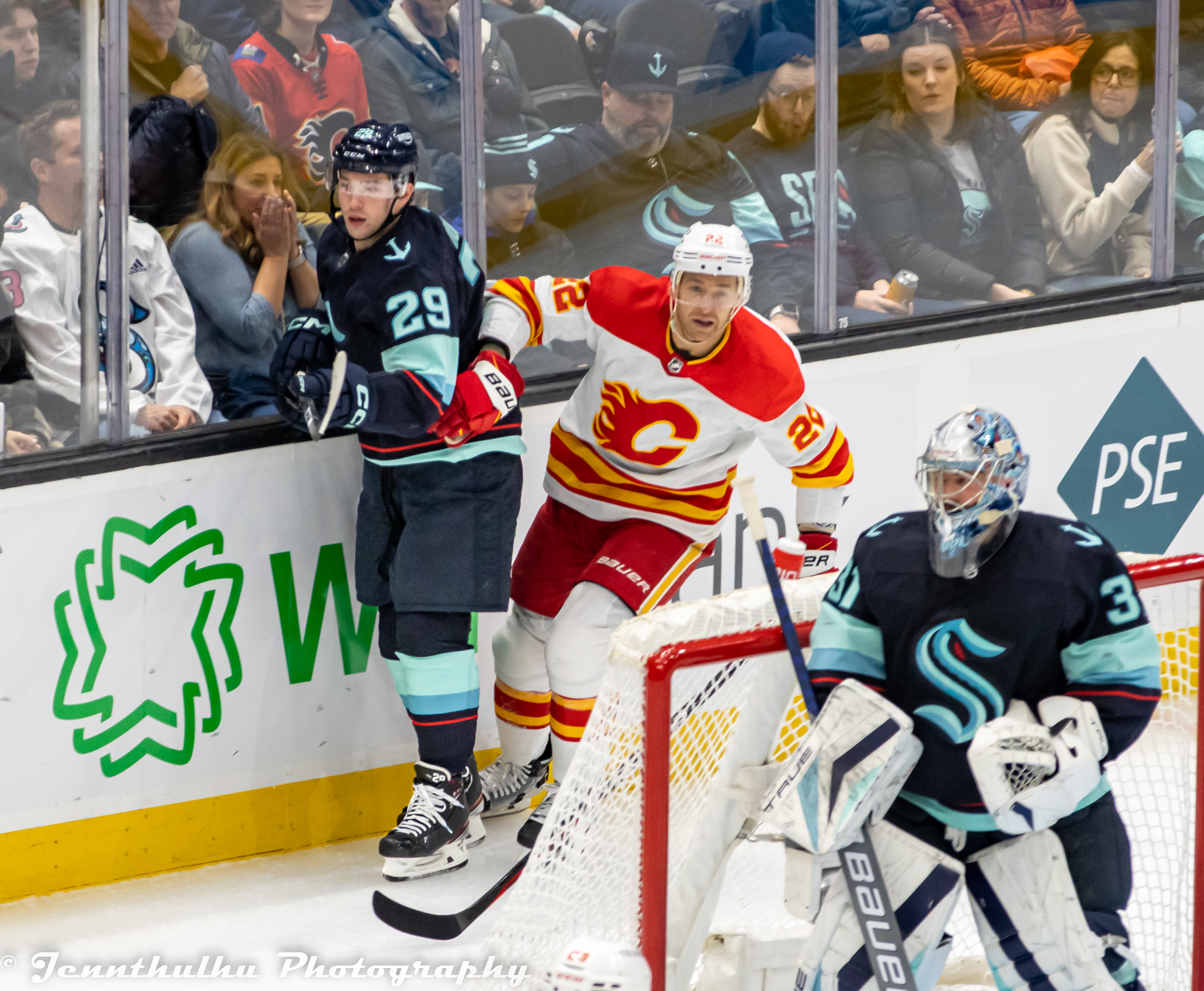
Lewis (center) during a game in December 2022

As a free agent leaving the Kings organization after 12 seasons, Lewis remained unsigned leading into the pandemic-delayed 2020–21 season. He accepted an invitation to join the Winnipeg Jets training camp on a professional tryout (PTO) basis, and upon impressing was later signed to a one-year, $750,000 contract by the Jets on January 13, 2021. Later, on February 2, Lewis scored his first goal as member of the Jets in a 3–2 win against the Calgary Flames.

On July 28, 2021, Lewis signed a one-year, $800,000 contract with the Calgary Flames, reuniting him with former Kings head coach Darryl Sutter. The 2022–23 season was just the second time in his NHL career where Lewis played in all 82 games of the season.

=== Return to Los Angeles (2023–2025) ===
On July 1, 2023, Lewis signed a one-year, $775,000 contract to return to the Kings. After playing a full 82-game season for a second consecutive year, Lewis signed a one-year, $800,000 extension on July 1, 2024.

During the 2024–25 season, he scored his 100th and 101st NHL goals on November 5, 2024, against the Minnesota Wild. On January 4, 2025, Lewis played in his 1,000th NHL game, a 2–1 win against the Tampa Bay Lightning.

On April 22, 2026, Lewis announced his retirement from professional hockey.

== Personal life ==
Lewis and his wife Kara have three children.

== Career statistics ==
=== Regular season and playoffs ===
			Regular season					Playoffs
Season	Team	League	GP	G	A	Pts	PIM	GP	G	A	Pts	PIM
2002–03	Pikes Peaks Miners	Midget	—	—	—	—	—	—	—	—	—	—
2003–04	Pikes Peaks Miners	Midget	—	—	—	—	—	—	—	—	—	—
2004–05	Des Moines Buccaneers	USHL	52	10	12	22	70	—	—	—	—	—
2005–06	Des Moines Buccaneers	USHL	56	35	40	75	69	11	3	13	16	16
2006–07	Owen Sound Attack	OHL	62	29	44	73	51	4	1	2	3	0
2006–07	Manchester Monarchs	AHL	8	4	2	6	2	2	0	0	0	0
2007–08	Manchester Monarchs	AHL	76	12	16	28	43	4	0	0	0	2
2008–09	Manchester Monarchs	AHL	75	20	31	51	30	—	—	—	—	—
2008–09	Los Angeles Kings	NHL	6	1	2	3	0	—	—	—	—	—
2009–10	Los Angeles Kings	NHL	5	0	0	0	0	—	—	—	—	—
2009–10	Manchester Monarchs	AHL	23	5	2	7	6	16	5	4	9	10
2010–11	Los Angeles Kings	NHL	72	3	10	13	6	6	1	3	4	2
2011–12	Los Angeles Kings	NHL	72	3	4	7	26	20	3	6	9	2
2012–13	Utah Grizzlies	ECHL	6	3	6	9	4	—	—	—	—	—
2012–13	Los Angeles Kings	NHL	48	5	9	14	19	18	1	2	3	2
2013–14	Los Angeles Kings	NHL	73	6	5	11	6	26	4	1	5	6
2014–15	Los Angeles Kings	NHL	73	9	16	25	14	—	—	—	—	—
2015–16	Los Angeles Kings	NHL	75	8	8	16	20	5	2	0	2	4
2016–17	Los Angeles Kings	NHL	82	12	12	24	30	—	—	—	—	—
2017–18	Los Angeles Kings	NHL	68	14	12	26	25	4	0	0	0	4
2018–19	Los Angeles Kings	NHL	44	3	9	12	9	—	—	—	—	—
2019–20	Los Angeles Kings	NHL	56	6	6	12	16	—	—	—	—	—
2020–21	Winnipeg Jets	NHL	56	5	5	10	2	8	0	0	0	0
2021–22	Calgary Flames	NHL	80	6	10	16	12	12	2	3	5	14
2022–23	Calgary Flames	NHL	82	9	11	20	18	—	—	—	—	—
2023–24	Los Angeles Kings	NHL	82	8	8	16	20	5	0	0	0	0
2024–25	Los Angeles Kings	NHL	60	6	6	12	20	2	0	0	0	0
NHL totals			1,034	104	133	237	243	106	13	15	28	34

=== International ===
Medal record

Men's ice hockey

Representing the United States

World Championships
Bronze medal – third place	2015 Czech Republic	

World Junior Championships
Bronze medal – third place	2007 Sweden	

Year	Team	Event	Result	GP	G	A	Pts	PIM
2007	United States	WJC	3rd place, bronze medalist(s)	7	1	1	2	2
2015	United States	WC	3rd place, bronze medalist(s)	10	3	6	9	6
Junior totals				7	1	1	2	2
Senior totals				10	3	6	9	6

== Awards and honors ==
Award	Year	Ref
USHL
First All-Star Team	2006	
Curt Hammer Award	2006	
Dave Tyler Junior Player of the Year Award	2006	
NHL
Stanley Cup champion	2012, 2014	
Calgary Flames
J. R. "Bud" McCaig Award	2022	

Awards and achievements
Preceded by Jonathan Bernier	Los Angeles Kings first-round draft pick 2006	Succeeded by Thomas Hickey
