= Dave Tyler =

American attorney

Dave Tyler is an American attorney, who was elected Director Emeritus in 2007 after serving 32 years USA Hockey's Board of Directors. He served the last 25 of them as the Vice President. He also served 12 years as the President of the United States Hockey League from 1982 to 1994.

== Career ==
Tyler has been involved with ice hockey since moving to Waterloo, Iowa and started working with the Waterloo Black Hawks. He was elected to the USA Hockey board of directors in 1975, along with current President Ron DeGregorio. He also served as the organization's secretary for a time. He held those positions until 2007, when he decided to not seek re-election.

He has represented the US at numerous international events, including the Winter Olympics. He was part of the 1980 Olympic delegation at Lake Placid, and escorted the Japanese team into the Olympic Village. Tyler led the US national junior team to their first ever gold medal in the Viking Cup in 2000, along with longtime friend Joe Benedetto.

He also has an award named after him, the Dave Tyler Junior Player of the Year Award, which is presented annually to the most outstanding American-born player in junior hockey.

Tyler is included as a featured person in the 2010 publication “American Ice Hockey Administrators” ISBN 1-158-33024-3
