= Lance Pitlick =

American ice hockey player

- Born: November 5, 1967 (age 58) Minneapolis, Minnesota, U.S.
- Height: 6 ft 0 in (183 cm)
- Weight: 203 lb (92 kg; 14 st 7 lb)
- Position: Defense
- Shot: Right
- Played for: Ottawa Senators; Florida Panthers
- NHL draft: 180th overall, 1986; Minnesota North Stars
- Playing career: 1990–2002

Lance Eric Pitlick (born November 5, 1967) is an American former professional ice hockey player. He played in the NHL with the Ottawa Senators and Florida Panthers.

== Playing career ==
Pitlick graduated from Robbinsdale Cooper High School in New Hope, Minnesota in 1986. He was drafted by his hometown Minnesota North Stars in the 9th round, 180th overall in the 1986 NHL entry draft. After being drafted, he played for the University of Minnesota for four years, providing a strong defensive presence for the Golden Gophers. Pitlick was the University of Minnesota team Captain during the 1989–90 season.

After college, Pitlick was signed by the Philadelphia Flyers and played with their minor league affiliate Hershey Bears of the AHL for four years. Prior to the 1994–95 season Pitlick signed with the Ottawa Senators and played the majority of the season with the Prince Edward Island Senators along with also making his NHL debut with the Senators, playing in 15 games. After splitting the 1995–96 season between the Senators and the minors Pitlick was able to stay in the NHL permanently and played another 3 years with the Senators, scoring a career high 10 points and 91 penalty minutes during the 1996–97 season. Prior to the 1999–00 season Pitlick signed with the Florida Panthers. He played 3 years with the Panthers before retiring after the 2001–02 season.

== Personal ==
Pitlick is not the only hockey player in his family; his nephew, Tyler Pitlick, who was selected by the Edmonton Oilers in the second round (31st overall) of the 2010 NHL entry draft, is currently playing in the NHL with the St. Louis Blues. His elder son Rem played collegiate hockey for the University of Minnesota and is currently playing for the Chicago Blackhawks of the NHL. His younger son, Rhett, plays NCAA hockey at the University of Minnesota and was drafted 131st by the Montreal Canadiens in the 2019 NHL entry draft.

His wife Lisa is also a former athlete. She attended the University of Minnesota and competed on Team USA's gymnastics team.

After retiring from professional hockey in 2002, Pitlick became the founder of a hockey training products business called Sweet Hockey, which was later merged with another entity to create Sniper's Edge Hockey. Pitlick and his business partner sold Sniper's Edge in 2019, but Pitlick remains an advisor to its current owner. Today operates as a hockey training professional and co-founder of onlinehockeytraining.com, and recently launched "The Hockey Journey" podcast series where he interviews influencers throughout the game of hockey. Pitlick recently interviewed CEO David Shuler of Snipers Edge Hockey as part of the podcast series.

== Career statistics ==
			Regular season					Playoffs
Season	Team	League	GP	G	A	Pts	PIM	GP	G	A	Pts	PIM
1985–86	Robbinsdale Cooper High School	HS-MN	21	7	18	25	247	—	—	—	—	—
1986–87	University of Minnesota	WCHA	45	0	9	9	88	—	—	—	—	—
1987–88	University of Minnesota	WCHA	38	3	9	12	76	—	—	—	—	—
1988–89	University of Minnesota	WCHA	47	4	9	13	95	—	—	—	—	—
1989–90	University of Minnesota	WCHA	14	3	2	5	26	—	—	—	—	—
1990–91	Hershey Bears	AHL	64	6	15	21	75	3	0	0	0	9
1991–92	Hershey Bears	AHL	4	0	0	0	6	3	0	0	0	4
1992–93	Hershey Bears	AHL	53	5	10	15	77	—	—	—	—	—
1993–94	Hershey Bears	AHL	58	4	13	17	93	11	1	0	1	11
1994–95	Prince Edward Island Senators	AHL	61	8	19	27	55	11	1	4	5	10
1994–95	Ottawa Senators	NHL	15	0	1	1	6	—	—	—	—	—
1995–96	Prince Edward Island Senators	AHL	29	4	10	14	39	5	0	0	0	0
1995–96	Ottawa Senators	NHL	28	1	6	7	20	—	—	—	—	—
1996–97	Ottawa Senators	NHL	66	5	5	10	91	7	0	0	0	4
1997–98	Ottawa Senators	NHL	69	2	7	9	50	11	0	1	1	17
1998–99	Ottawa Senators	NHL	50	3	6	9	33	2	0	0	0	0
1999–2000	Florida Panthers	NHL	62	3	5	8	44	4	0	1	1	0
2000–01	Florida Panthers	NHL	68	1	2	3	42	—	—	—	—	—
2001–02	Florida Panthers	NHL	35	1	1	2	12	—	—	—	—	—
AHL totals			269	27	67	94	345	33	2	4	6	34
NHL totals			393	16	33	49	298	24	0	2	2	21

== Awards and honours ==
Award	Year
AHL
All-Star Game	1995
