= Tyler Pitlick =

American ice hockey player (born 1991)

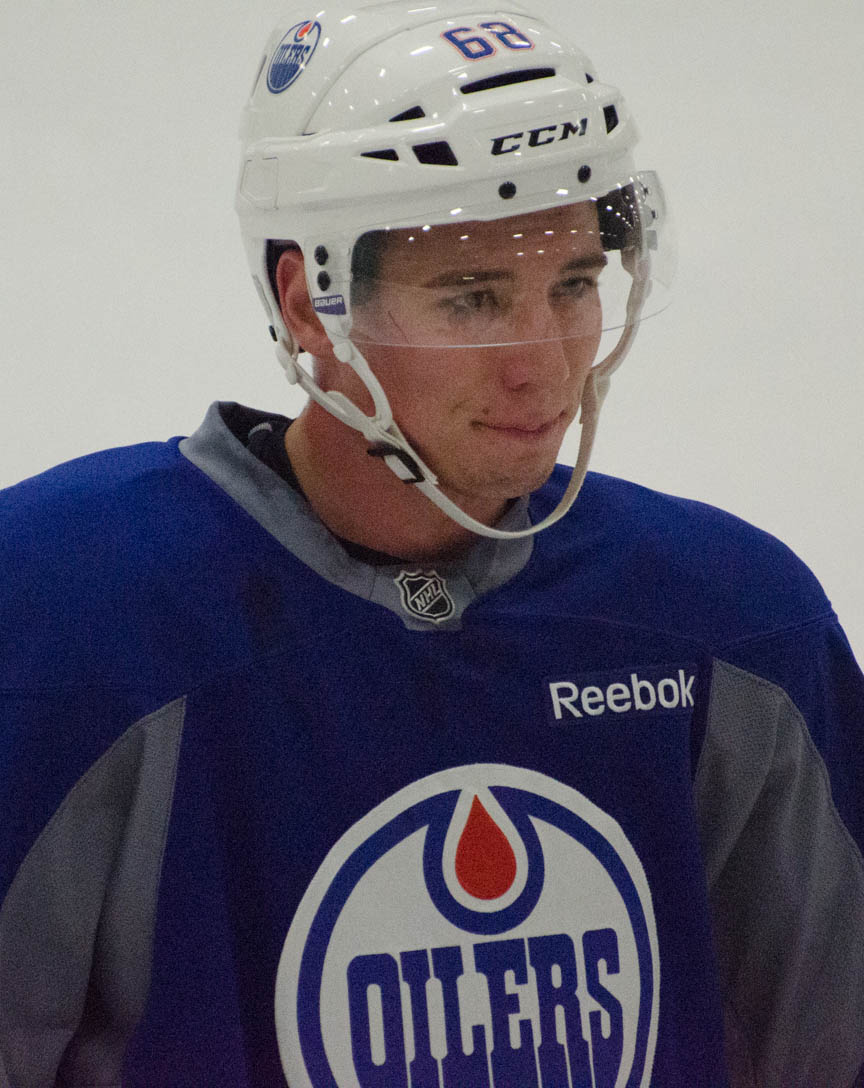
- Pitlick with the Edmonton Oilers in 2014
- Born: November 1, 1991 (age 35) Minneapolis, Minnesota, U.S.
- Height: 6 ft 2 in (188 cm)
- Weight: 202 lb (92 kg; 14 st 6 lb)
- Position: Forward
- Shoots: Right
- NHL team (P) Cur. team Former teams: Minnesota Wild; Iowa Wild (AHL); Edmonton Oilers; Dallas Stars; Philadelphia Flyers; Arizona Coyotes; Calgary Flames; Montreal Canadiens; St. Louis Blues; New York Rangers
- NHL draft: 31st overall, 2010; Edmonton Oilers
- Playing career: 2011–present

Tyler Pitlick (born November 1, 1991) is an American professional ice hockey player who is a forward for the Iowa Wild of the American Hockey League (AHL) while under contract to the Minnesota Wild of the National Hockey League (NHL). He was selected in the second round, 31st overall, by the Edmonton Oilers in the 2010 NHL entry draft. Pitlick has also previously played for the Dallas Stars, Philadelphia Flyers, Arizona Coyotes, Calgary Flames, Montreal Canadiens, St. Louis Blues and New York Rangers.

== Early life ==
Pitlick was born on November 1, 1991, in Minneapolis, Minnesota. He grew up in Champlin, Minnesota, but moved to Lino Lakes and later Centerville in middle school to be with his mother Amy. His father John worked as a researcher in Minneapolis and served as a local hockey coach, but he chose not to coach his son.

== Playing career ==
=== Junior ===
After playing a freshman season with Minnesota State University, Mankato and a single season of major junior hockey with the Medicine Hat Tigers of the Western Hockey League, on April 13, 2011 the Edmonton Oilers signed Pitlick to a three-year entry-level contract.

=== Professional ===
==== Edmonton Oilers ====
The Edmonton Oilers of the National Hockey League (NHL) selected Pitlick in the second round, 31st overall, of the 2010 NHL entry draft. He signed a three-year, entry-level contract with the team on April 13, 2011. He was assigned to the Oklahoma City Barons, the Oilers' American Hockey League (AHL) affiliate, for the 2011-12 season, and, after a handful of early-season benchings to allow all the Barons forwards to receive playing time, Pitlick established himself as a regular member of the roster. Just like Philippe Cornet the year before, Pitlick went through an adjustment period in the first part of the season before starting on a hot streak in February. In his rookie AHL season, Pitlick scored seven goals and 23 points in 62 games, and was second among Edmonton prospects with 130 shots on goal.

Pitlick struggled during the 2012-13 season with the Barons, scoring only two assists and no goals in his first 14 games before suffering a concussion at the end of November. After he returned, Pitlick's point drought continued, with only one goal on 52 shots before suffering a knee injury on January 21, 2013. Although his scoring improved after he returned from the injury, Pitlick played in only 44 games with the Barons during his sophomore AHL season, scoring three goals and seven assists. He put up an additional six points in nine playoff games before Oklahoma City fell to the Grand Rapids Griffins in the Calder Cup conference finals.

After starting the 2013-14 season with the Barons, Pitlick was called up to Edmonton on October 22, 2013, after Oilers forward Taylor Hall suffered a knee injury and was expected to be out for four weeks. He made his NHL debut the same day, providing three hits and two shots in a 4-3 victory over the Montreal Canadiens. Four days later, he scored his first NHL goal, firing past Mike Smith in the first period of a 5-4 loss to the Phoenix Coyotes. He exited the game in the second period after suffering a knee injury, which caused Pitlick to miss 19 games before he was reassigned to the Barons on December 9. He was called up again in late March, and once again missed five games due to injury. In total, Pitlick played 11 games with Edmonton, scoring only one goal, as well as 39 games with Oklahoma City, posting eight goals and 22 points.

==== Dallas Stars ====
Pitlick became a free agent after the 2016-17 season, and on July 1, 2017, he signed a three-year, $3 million contract with the Dallas Stars. He had a strong start to the 2017-18 season, serving on a line with center Radek Faksa and left wing Antoine Roussel. In his first nine games with the Stars, Pitlick scored two goals and two assists, and general manager Jim Nill praised his speed and energy on the ice. Pitlick enjoyed playing on the defensive forward line, telling The Dallas Morning News that it was "fun to play with guys that want to work and want to grind it out down low". In his first full season with the NHL, Pitlick appeared in 80 of the Stars' 82 games, putting up 14 goals and 13 assists with a +9 rating. Many of those points came in hot streaks that were accompanied by long scoring droughts; in the middle of the season, Pitlick had a 29-game stretch with six goals and no assists.

Pitlick continued to play on the Stars' third line for the 2018-19 season, with an emphasis on blocking shots and on the penalty kill. His season was interrupted on January 17, 2018, when Pitlick took a hit from Dustin Brown of the Los Angeles Kings. After leaving the game from the hit, he noticed a separate wrist injury that did not improve after a cortisone shot. On February 6, Pitlick underwent wrist surgery to repair a displaced tendon, with a target return date for April 2. In his first game back, Pitlick played on the fourth line with Jason Spezza and Mattias Janmark, scoring a goal in the third period of a 6-2 victory over the Philadelphia Flyers and helping clinch a playoff berth for the Stars. In 47 regular season games with the Stars that season, Pitlick scored 12 points and averaged over 13 minutes of ice time. He also had six appearances in the 2019 Stanley Cup playoffs, where Dallas advanced to the second round.

==== Philadelphia Flyers ====
On June 24, 2019, the Stars traded Pitlick to the Philadelphia Flyers in exchange for right winger Ryan Hartman. He missed the start of the Flyers' training camp after undergoing wrist surgery at the end of August, with an expected recovery time of four weeks. He had a slow beginning to the season, putting up two goals in 26 games, but began to receive more ice time, and when Travis Konecny was forced to miss a game in December with a concussion, Pitlick was chosen over James van Riemsdyk to play on the top line. In the limited minutes that he played across 63 games before the NHL was suspended due to the COVID-19 pandemic, Pitlick focused his energy on the penalty kill while putting up eight goals, 12 assists and a +11 rating. When the NHL resumed for the 2020 Stanley Cup playoffs in Toronto, Pitlick was one of 31 Flyers selected for the "bubble". He saw time during the playoffs on both the third and fourth lines, playing a critical role with Michael Raffl and Nate Thompson in a round-robin victory over the Boston Bruins. In a total of 16 playoff games, Pitlick scored two goals and one assist.

==== Arizona Coyotes ====
Pitlick, who became a free agent after the 2019-20 season, signed a two-year deal with the Arizona Coyotes on the first day of the free agent market, with an annual cap hit of $1.75 million. General manager Bill Armstrong was interested in the physicality of Pitlick's play, and he drew praise throughout the 2020-21 season for his energy, speed, and strength, particularly on the forecheck. On March 6, 2021, Pitlick scored two goals against the Minnesota Wild; it was his first multi-goal game since December 2017. Later in the season, however, Pitlick missed playing time, first with an undisclosed injury in late March followed by a lower body injury in April. In 38 games with Arizona, Pitlick scored six goals and five assists, as well as 81 hits and 41 blocked shots.

==== Calgary Flames ====
On July 21, 2021, Pitlick was the Seattle Kraken's selection from the Coyotes at the 2021 NHL expansion draft. The following day, Seattle traded Pitlick to the Calgary Flames in exchange for a fourth-round pick in the 2022 NHL entry draft.

==== Montreal Canadiens ====
On February 14, 2022, Pitlick was traded along with Emil Heineman and draft picks to the Montreal Canadiens for winger Tyler Toffoli, joining his cousin Rem. After recovering from an injury prior to the trade, Pitlick played out the remainder of the 2021–22 season with the bottom placed Canadiens, registering 3 points in 14 games.

==== St. Louis Blues ====
As a free agent from the Canadiens, Pitlick went un-signed over the summer before accepting a professional try-out contract with the St. Louis Blues on September 1, 2022. Pitlick was then signed to a one-year contract on October 25, 2022, after Blues forward Pavel Buchnevich was placed on injured reserve. Pitlick featured in 61 regular season games, contributing with 7 goals and 16 points, as the Blues missed the post-season.

==== New York Rangers ====
On July 1, 2023, Pitlick as a free agent was signed to his eighth NHL team, agreeing to a one-year, $787,500 contract with the New York Rangers for the 2023–24 season. On February 13, 2024, the Rangers placed him on waivers after he produced only 1 goal and 4 points in 34 games. He was assigned to Hartford after clearing waivers, but after Hartford was eliminated from the Calder Cup playoffs, he was recalled to the Rangers roster for the Stanley Cup playoffs.

==== Boston Bruins ====
As a free agent over the summer from the Rangers and leading into the 2024–25 season, Pitlick was belatedly signed to a professional tryout (PTO) with the Providence Bruins of the AHL, the primary affiliate to the Boston Bruins, on October 16, 2024. Pitlick contributed offensively with 33 points through 43 appearances with Providence before he was signed for the remainder of the season to a two-way contract with the Boston Bruins on March 6, 2025.

==== Minnesota Wild ====
On July 1, 2025, having concluded his contract with the Bruins, Pitlick signed as a free agent to a two-year, two-way contract with hometown team, the Minnesota Wild.

== Personal life ==
Pitlick comes from a hockey playing family; his uncle Lance played 339 games in the NHL with the Florida Panthers and Ottawa Senators. His cousin Rem was drafted 76th overall by the Nashville Predators in the 2016 NHL entry draft and last played for the Chicago Blackhawks in 2024. Another cousin, Rhett Pitlick, the younger brother of Rem, has played NCAA hockey for the University of Minnesota and Minnesota State Mankato and was drafted 131st overall by the Montreal Canadiens in the 2019 NHL entry draft.

== Career statistics ==
			Regular season					Playoffs
Season	Team	League	GP	G	A	Pts	PIM	GP	G	A	Pts	PIM
2007–08	Centennial High School	HS-MN	21	23	23	46	12	2	1	4	5	2
2008–09	Centennial High School	HS-MN	22	37	31	58	10	3	4	2	6	2
2009–10	Minnesota State Mavericks	WCHA	38	11	8	19	27	—	—	—	—	—
2010–11	Medicine Hat Tigers	WHL	56	27	35	62	31	—	—	—	—	—
2011–12	Oklahoma City Barons	AHL	62	7	16	23	28	13	2	5	7	2
2012–13	Oklahoma City Barons	AHL	44	3	7	10	10	16	2	4	6	8
2013–14	Oklahoma City Barons	AHL	39	8	14	22	10	2	0	0	0	0
2013–14	Edmonton Oilers	NHL	10	1	0	1	0	—	—	—	—	—
2014–15	Oklahoma City Barons	AHL	14	3	6	9	8	—	—	—	—	—
2014–15	Edmonton Oilers	NHL	17	2	0	2	4	—	—	—	—	—
2015–16	Bakersfield Condors	AHL	37	7	14	21	4	—	—	—	—	—
2016–17	Edmonton Oilers	NHL	31	8	3	11	6	—	—	—	—	—
2017–18	Dallas Stars	NHL	80	14	13	27	34	—	—	—	—	—
2018–19	Dallas Stars	NHL	47	8	4	12	6	6	0	0	0	2
2019–20	Philadelphia Flyers	NHL	63	8	12	20	12	16	2	1	3	0
2020–21	Arizona Coyotes	NHL	38	6	5	11	16	—	—	—	—	—
2021–22	Calgary Flames	NHL	25	0	2	2	2	—	—	—	—	—
2021–22	Montreal Canadiens	NHL	14	1	2	3	4	—	—	—	—	—
2022–23	St. Louis Blues	NHL	61	7	9	16	14	—	—	—	—	—
2023–24	New York Rangers	NHL	34	1	3	4	4	—	—	—	—	—
2023–24	Hartford Wolf Pack	AHL	22	3	4	7	2	10	1	2	3	4
2024–25	Providence Bruins	AHL	59	21	25	46	34	7	1	0	1	2
2025–26	Iowa Wild	AHL	20	10	5	15	0	—	—	—	—	—
2025–26	Minnesota Wild	NHL	32	2	0	2	24	—	—	—	—	—
NHL totals			452	58	53	111	126	22	2	1	3	2
