= Jordan Harris (ice hockey) =

American ice hockey player (born 2000)

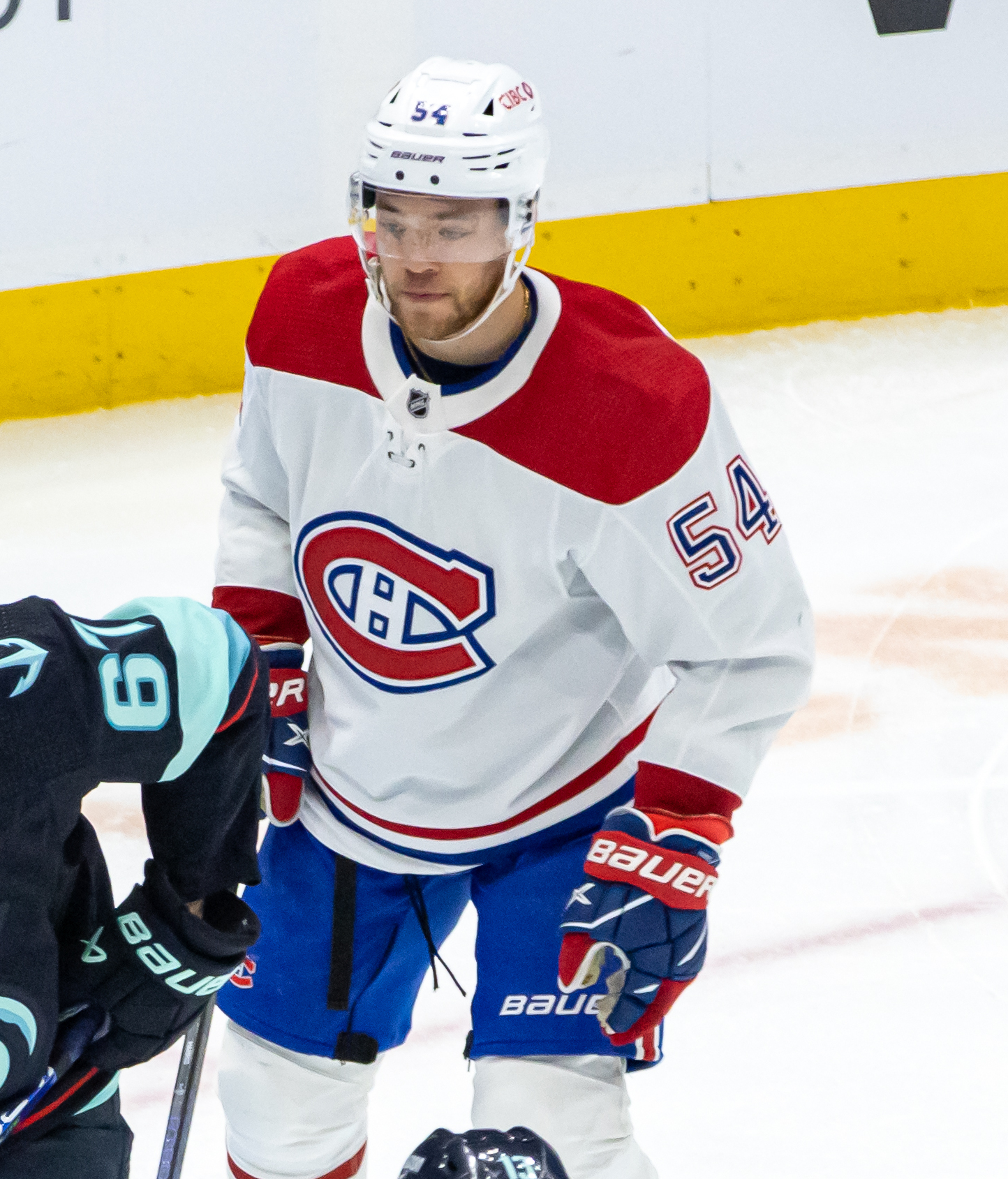
- Harris with the Montreal Canadiens in 2022
- Born: July 7, 2000 (age 26) Haverhill, Massachusetts, U.S.
- Height: 6 ft 0 in (183 cm)
- Weight: 189 lb (86 kg; 13 st 7 lb)
- Position: Defense
- Shoots: Left
- NHL team (P) Cur. team Former teams: Boston Bruins; Providence Bruins (AHL); Montreal Canadiens; Columbus Blue Jackets
- NHL draft: 71st overall, 2018; Montreal Canadiens
- Playing career: 2022–present

Jordan Harris (born July 7, 2000) is an American professional ice hockey player who is a defenseman for the Providence Bruins in the American Hockey League (AHL) while under contract to the Boston Bruins of the National Hockey League (NHL). He was selected in the third round, 71st overall, by the Montreal Canadiens in the 2018 NHL entry draft. Harris has also previously played for the Columbus Blue Jackets.

== Early life ==
Harris was born on July 7, 2000, in Haverhill, Massachusetts, to Ginny and Peter Harris, a nurse and physical therapist, and is both biracial and Jewish. Harris' mother is white and non-Jewish. His father is half-black and Jewish, having been adopted from a Jewish orphanage.

Being an African-American Jew, as of March 2024 he was the only Black Jewish player in the NHL. His father played ice hockey for UMass Lowell, and Jordan almost became a goaltender like his father and older brother Elijah, but he "liked being able to skate and play out of the net too much", so he became a defenseman.

Harris attended Haverhill High School for one year before transferring to Kimball Union Academy, a boarding school in New Hampshire. In his three years at Kimball, Harris had 18 goals and 64 assists in 111 games, and he was the team's captain during the 2017–18 season. That season, he had six goals and 29 assists in 37 games, and was also a star on Kimball's lacrosse team. Harris also played five games with the Youngstown Phantoms of the United States Hockey League during their 2017–18 season.

== Playing career ==
=== College ===
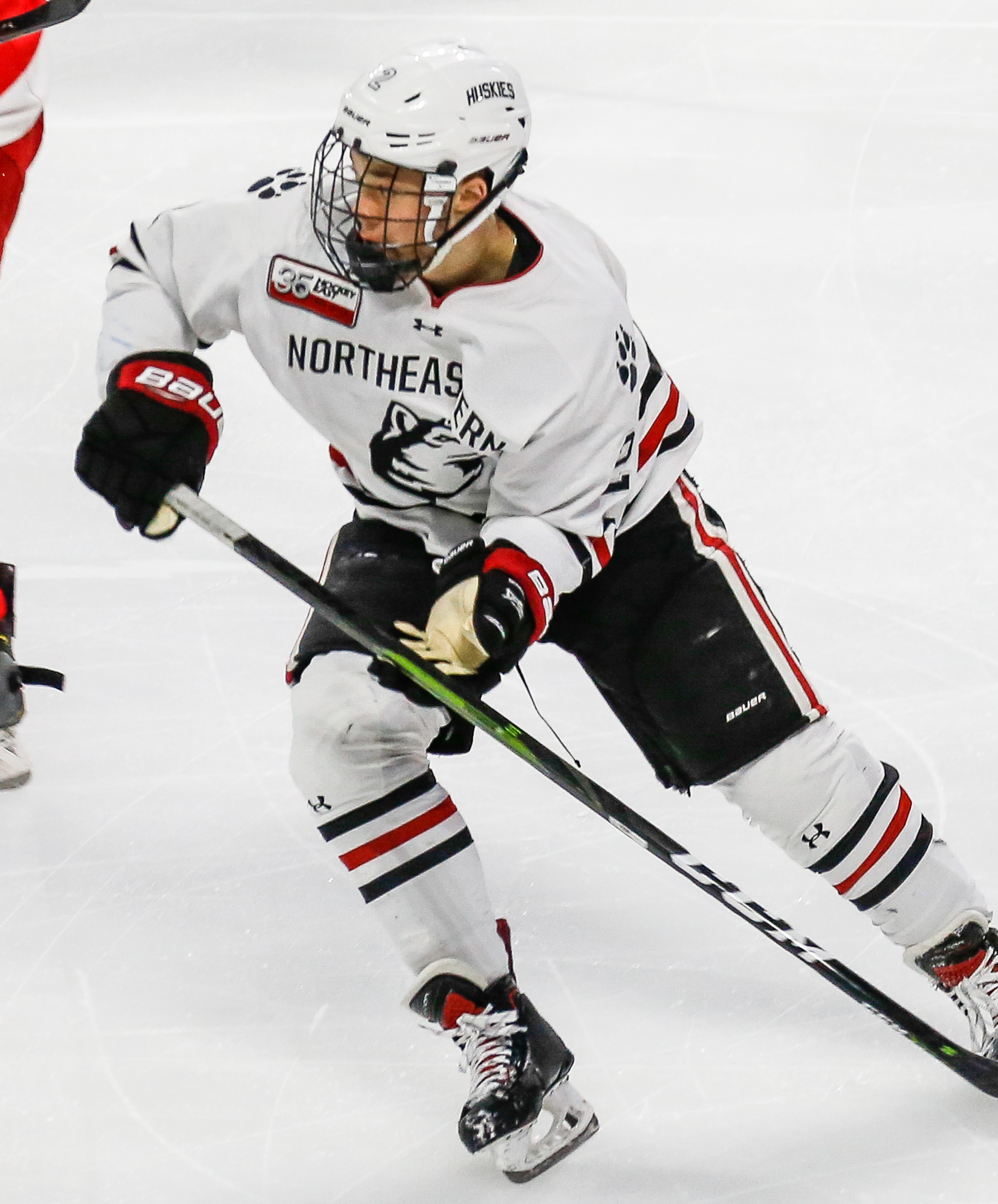
Harris at Northeastern in March 2019

The Montreal Canadiens of the National Hockey League (NHL) selected Harris in the third round, 71st overall, of the 2018 NHL entry draft. At the time of the draft, he had committed to playing college ice hockey at Northeastern. He was joined at Northeastern by another prospect in the Canadiens organization, goaltender Cayden Primeau. Harris picked up his first collegiate goal on October 13, 2018, opening the scoring for Northeastern in their 5–0 shutout win over Sacred Heart. Harris had one goal and 12 assists in 39 games during his freshman season with Northeastern, which won both the 2019 Beanpot and the 2019 Hockey East Men's Ice Hockey Tournament.

Harris collected a point at least once in the first four games of Northeastern's 2019–20 season, doubling his goals total from the previous season. By the Huskies' holiday break, he had established himself as a playmaker for the team, with three goals and 13 points through 18 games, fifth among Hockey East defensemen. Harris won the 2020 Beanpot for Northeastern in double overtime, breaking their 4–4 tie against Boston University to give the Huskies their third title in a row. Harris's sophomore season came to a premature end due to the impacts of the COVID-19 pandemic, but the Huskies presented him with the Unsung Hero Award for his accomplishments. He finished the season with three goals and 21 points while averaging between 25 and 30 minutes of time on ice per night.

The Huskies named Harris an alternate captain for the team's 2020–21 season. His performance in the first half of the season won praise from sportswriters who were impressed by his hockey IQ, and he was named the Hockey East Player of the Week on December 14 after scoring two goals and three assists in Northeastern's opening-weekend sweep of Merrimack. With six goals and 19 points for the season, third in the conference, Harris was a semifinalist for the Walter Brown Award, a Hobey Baker Award finalist, and he was named to the Hockey East Second All-Star Team. Harris declined to sign with the Canadiens after his junior year, fueling speculation that he would attempt to become an unrestricted free agent after graduating, but he told reporters that he was more invested in finishing his degree.

The Huskies named Harris their captain for the 2021–22 season. He was named the Hockey East Defender of the Week on November 1 after scoring one goal and recording three assists in a two-game sweep of Maine. In his senior season, Harris scored five goals and 20 points in 38 games. This included five goals and 14 points in 20 conference games, for which Harris was named both a Hockey East First Team All-Star and the conference's Best Defensive Defenseman. He finished his collegiate career with 15 goals and 73 points in 130 games across four seasons.

=== Professional ===
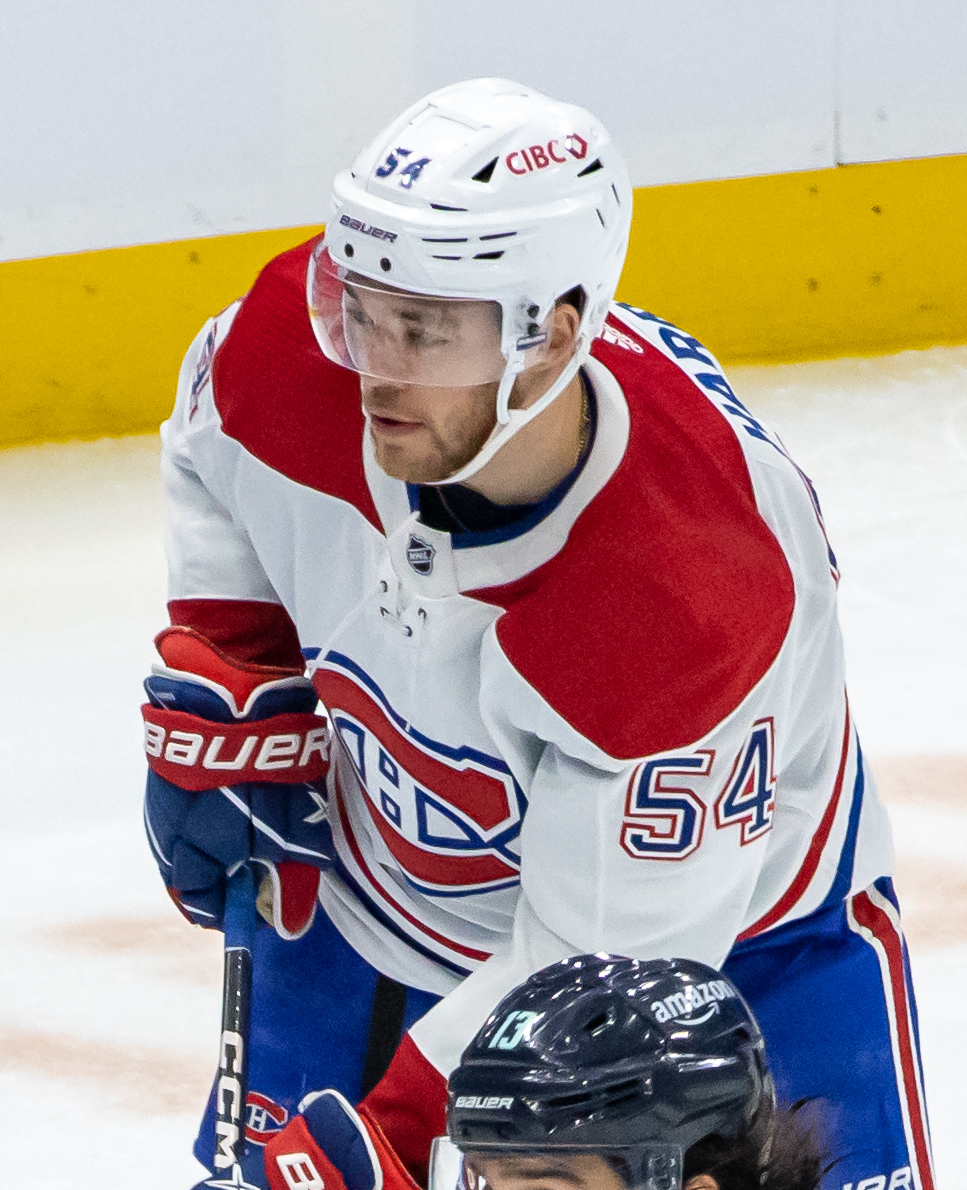
Harris with the Canadiens in December 2022

Shortly after the end of his college hockey career, Harris signed a two-year, entry-level contract with the Canadiens and joined them for the end of their 2021–22 season. He debuted with the team on April 2, 2022, finishing the game with a plus–minus rating of +1 with three blocked shots in Montreal's 5–4 shootout win over the Tampa Bay Lightning. Playing ten games with the Canadiens to close out the season, he scored his first NHL goal in the April 29 season-ending game against the Florida Panthers. The Canadiens won the game 10–2.

On August 19, 2024, Harris was traded to the Columbus Blue Jackets, in exchange for Patrik Laine and a 2nd-round pick in 2026. In the 2024–25 season, as a depth defenseman with the Blue Jackets, Harris was limited to 33 regular season games, posting 1 goal and 4 assists for 5 points.

As a pending restricted free agent, Harris was not tendered a qualifying offer by the Blue Jackets, releasing him as a free agent after just one season. On July 1, 2025, Harris was signed to a one-year, $825,000 contract with the Boston Bruins for the 2025–26 season. The Bruins re-signed Harris in July 2026 for another one-year contract at $850,000.

== International play ==
Harris represented the United States internationally at the 2020 World Junior Ice Hockey Championships in the Czech Republic. He scored his first goal of the tournament on the second day, taking a pass from Trevor Zegras to tie Team USA 1–1 against Germany; the US took the game in a 6–3 victory. The US team was eliminated during the semifinals with a 1–0 loss to Finland, the first time they failed to advance to the medal round since 2015. In five games, Harris scored one goal and finished with a +4 plus-minus.

== Personal life ==
Harris's brother Elijah is also a hockey player. After goaltending at Austin Preparatory School, he enrolled at Endicott College to play for the Gulls. Harris, his brother, and father (all being Black) have spoken about the challenges experienced by Black hockey players. Speaking at a screening of the documentary Black Ice, he said "I’m really proud of my heritage and the way I grew up. I feel extremely lucky to have been raised the way I was; biracial and Jewish, and raised to love hockey for what it is."

As of 2026, Harris is engaged to his fiancée, Codie. The couple met at Northeastern University, where Codie played defense for the women's hockey team. In January 2026, the couple adopted a Mini Bernedoodle puppy named Chai.

== Career statistics ==
=== Regular season and playoffs ===
			Regular season					Playoffs
Season	Team	League	GP	G	A	Pts	PIM	GP	G	A	Pts	PIM
2014–15	Islanders Hockey Club 16U AAA	USPHL 16U	10	0	1	1	2	3	0	0	0	0
2015–16	Kimball Union Academy	HS-Prep	35	5	16	21	—	—	—	—	—	—
2016–17	Kimball Union Academy	HS-Prep	39	7	19	26	—	—	—	—	—	—
2017–18	Kimball Union Academy	HS-Prep	37	6	29	35	—	—	—	—	—	—
2017–18	Youngstown Phantoms	USHL	5	0	1	1	0	—	—	—	—	—
2018–19	Northeastern University	HE	39	1	12	13	8	—	—	—	—	—
2019–20	Northeastern University	HE	33	3	18	21	20	—	—	—	—	—
2020–21	Northeastern University	HE	19	6	13	19	8	—	—	—	—	—
2021–22	Northeastern University	HE	39	5	15	20	14	—	—	—	—	—
2021–22	Montreal Canadiens	NHL	10	1	0	1	8	—	—	—	—	—
2022–23	Montreal Canadiens	NHL	65	4	13	17	26	—	—	—	—	—
2023–24	Montreal Canadiens	NHL	56	3	11	14	22	—	—	—	—	—
2024–25	Columbus Blue Jackets	NHL	33	1	4	5	6	—	—	—	—	—
2025–26	Boston Bruins	NHL	8	1	2	3	0	1	0	0	0	0
2025–26	Providence Bruins	AHL	4	1	2	3	0	—	—	—	—	—
NHL totals			172	10	30	40	62	1	0	0	0	0

=== International ===
Year	Team	Event	Result	GP	G	A	Pts	PIM
2020	United States	WJC	6th	5	1	0	1	2
Junior totals				5	1	0	1	2

== Awards and honors ==
Award	Year	Ref
College
All-Hockey East Second Team	2020–21	
All-Hockey East First Team	2021–22	
Hockey East Best Defensive Defenseman	2021–22	
AHCA East Second Team All-American	2021–22	
New England Best Defenceman	2021–22	
New England D1 All-Stars	2021–22	
Boston Bruins
John P. Bucyk Award	2026	

== See also ==
- List of black NHL players
- List of select Jewish ice hockey players
