= Rem Pitlick =

Canadian-American ice hockey player (born 1997)

- Born: April 2, 1997 (age 29) Ottawa, Ontario, Canada
- Height: 5 ft 11 in (180 cm)
- Weight: 196 lb (89 kg; 14 st 0 lb)
- Position: Center
- Shoots: Left
- team Former teams: Free agent Nashville Predators; Minnesota Wild; Montreal Canadiens; Chicago Blackhawks
- NHL draft: 76th overall, 2016; Nashville Predators
- Playing career: 2019–present

Rem Pitlick (born April 2, 1997) is a Canadian-born American professional ice hockey center who is currently an unrestricted free agent. He most recently played under contract with the Rockford IceHogs in the American Hockey League (AHL). He was selected in the third round, 76th overall, by the Nashville Predators in the 2016 NHL entry draft. Pitlick has also previously played for the Minnesota Wild, Montreal Canadiens and Chicago Blackhawks.

Prior to turning professional, Pitlick played for the Muskegon Lumberjacks and Waterloo Black Hawks in the United States Hockey League (USHL). In 2016, he set a franchise record with the Lumberjacks for most points in a season and was awarded the USHL Player of the Year, USHL Forward of the Year, and Dave Tyler Junior Player of the Year Award. Following his successful junior career, Pitlick joined the University of Minnesota where he was selected for the All-Big Ten Freshman Team and First Team. His father, Lance Pitlick, played in the NHL for the Ottawa Senators and Florida Panthers.

== Playing career ==
=== Amateur ===
In August 2013, Pitlick committed to play Division I college ice hockey for the Minnesota Golden Gophers. Pitlick began playing in the United States Hockey League (USHL) for the Waterloo Black Hawks. After spending the 2014–15 season with the Black Hawks, he was traded to the Muskegon Lumberjacks in exchange for a first and tenth round pick in the USHL draft. During the 2015–16 season, while with the Lumberjacks, Pitlick set a new franchise record for most points in a season and was awarded USHL Player of the Year and USHL Forward of the Year. He was also named to the First Team All-USHL and given the Dave Tyler Junior Player of the Year Award. At the end of the season, Pitlick announced he was leaving the USHL to join the Golden Gophers for the 2016–17 season.

=== Collegiate ===
In his freshman season with the Golden Gophers, Pitlick played in 36 games and recorded 32 points. He scored his first collegiate goal on October 7, 2016, in a 6–0 win over the Alaska Anchorage Seawolves. At the conclusion of the season, Pitlick was selected for the Big Ten All-Freshman Team. In his sophomore season, Pitlick played in 38 games and recorded 31 points. He also recorded an eight-game point streak between October 27 and November 18. At the conclusion of the season, Pitlick was selected for the Academic All-Big Ten team.

In his junior season, Pitlick played in 38 games and set a new career high in points with 45 points. He was named the Big Ten First Star of The Week after he recorded five points in a weekend series against the Michigan Wolverines. He ended the season as a Hobey Baker Award nominee and selected for the All-Big Ten First Team. On March 12, Pitlick was named to the AHCA First-Team All-American, becoming the 65th person to earn All-American honors in Minnesota history.

=== Professional ===
==== Nashville Predators (2019–2021) ====
Pitlick was selected by the Nashville Predators of the National Hockey League (NHL) in the third round, 76th overall of the 2016 NHL entry draft. He signed a two-year entry-level contract with the Predators on March 22, 2019, concluding his collegiate career. He made his NHL debut on March 25, against the Minnesota Wild. He appeared in the one game. Pitlick was assigned to the Predators' American Hockey League (AHL) affiliate, the Milwaukee Admirals, for the 2019–20 season. He appeared in 63 games, scoring 20 goals and 36 points, before the season was suspended due to the COVID-19 pandemic.

Due to the ongoing pandemic, the Admirals opted out of the 2020–21 season and Pitlick was instead assigned to the AHL's Chicago Wolves to start the season. He scored eight goals and ten points in eight games and was named the AHL Player of the Month for February 2020. He was recalled by Nashville along with defenseman Jérémy Davies on March 4, 2021 and made his NHL season debut on March 7 in a 4–3 victory over the Dallas Stars. He mainly played among the bottom six forwards, competing for a spot with Tanner Jeannot, Yakov Trenin, and Mathieu Olivier for the final spots in the lineup. He registered his first two NHL points, assisting on goals by Colton Sissons and Mikael Granlund in a 7–2 win over the Tampa Bay Lightning on April 13. He played in ten games with Nashville, recording just the two points.

==== Minnesota Wild (2021–2022) ====
After attending the Predators 2021 training camp, prior to being reassigned to the AHL to begin the 2021–22 season, Pitlick was claimed off waivers by the Minnesota Wild on October 6. He made his Wild debut on October 26, assisting on Matt Dumba's game winning goal in the third period of a 3–2 win over the Vancouver Canucks. In his fifth game with the Wild on November 13, Pitlick scored his first three NHL goals with a natural hat trick against goaltender Philipp Grubauer, securing a 4–2 win over the Seattle Kraken. He played in 20 games with Minnesota, scoring six goals and 11 points.

==== Montreal Canadiens (2022–2023) ====
On January 11, 2022, Pitlick was placed on waivers by the Wild, and was claimed by the Montreal Canadiens. He made his debut in a 3–2 overtime loss to the Chicago Blackhawks on January 13. He scored his first goal for the team in the next game on January 17, taking a pass from Jonathan Drouin to beat Karel Vejmelka of the Arizona Coyotes in a 7–2 loss. He made an immediate impact on arrival in Montreal, in the midst of what was a historically poor season for the team, registering six points in his first seven games and almost double the average ice time he had with the Wild. At the end of the season, Pitlick registered nine goals and 17 assists for 27 points with the Canadiens.

After initially testing free agency, Pitlick was re-signed to a two-year, $2.2 million contract extension with the Canadiens on July 16. However, he struggled early in the next season, amidst a logjam of forwards in the Canadiens roster. He dressed for seven of the team's first twelve games, registering no points. On November 7, with fellow forward Evgenii Dadonov scheduled to return to the roster from injured reserve, it was announced that Pitlick was being put on waivers. After going unclaimed on waivers, he was assigned to Montreal's AHL affiliate, the Laval Rocket. After injuries to several starting players, Pitlick was recalled on November 16, recording three points in three games with Laval. He spent the rest of the season going between the Canadiens and the Rocket. In a memorable game against the Toronto Maple Leafs on January 21, 2023, Pitlick scored in overtime in three-on-three play to win the match for Montreal. He played in 18 games with Laval, scoring five goals and 22 points and 46 games with Montreal, adding six goals and 15 points.

==== Pittsburgh Penguins (2023–2024) ====
On August 6, Pitlick was traded to the Pittsburgh Penguins as part of a three-team trade also involving the San Jose Sharks. He did not make the Penguins' team out of training camp and was placed on waivers. After going unclaimed he was assigned to Pittsburgh's AHL affiliate, the Wilkes-Barre/Scranton Penguins on October 5. He played in 32 games with Wilkes-Barre/Scranton, registering eight goals and 24 points in 32 games.

==== Chicago Blackhawks (2024) ====
Pitlick was traded to the Chicago Blackhawks on January 6, 2024 for a conditional seventh-round pick in the 2026 NHL entry draft. He made his debut on January 9 in a 2–1 loss to the Edmonton Oilers, playing on the first line with Philipp Kurashev and Taylor Raddysh. He appeared in nine games with Chicago, going scoreless. He was placed on waivers by the Blackhawks on February 14 and after going unclaimed, was assigned to Chicago's AHL affiliate, the Rockford IceHogs. He appeared in 27 games with Rockford, scoring 14 goals and 33 points. At the end of the season, Pitlick was left unsigned and departed the team as unrestricted free agent on July 1.

==== Minor league ====
As an un-signed free agent well into the midpoint of the 2024–25 season, Pitlick was belatedly signed to a AHL contract with the San Jose Barracuda on February 5, 2025. Pitlick played out the remainder of the season with the Barracuda, posting 13 points through 18 appearances.

As a free agent, Pitlick opted to continue in the AHL by joining younger brother, Rhett, after signing a one-year contract with the Bakersfield Condors on June 25, 2025. On December 14, the Condors traded Pitlick to the IceHogs, in exchange for Tyson Feist, marking Pitlick's second stint within the organization.

== International play ==
Pitlick has represented Team USA at the 2015 World Junior A Challenge.

== Personal life ==
Pitlick was born in Ottawa, Ontario when his father, Lance was a member of the Ottawa Senators and is a dual citizen of both Canada and the United States. His mother Lisa is also a former athlete. She attended the University of Minnesota and competed on Team USA's gymnastics team. His younger brother, Rhett, was drafted by the Montreal Canadiens in the fifth round of the 2019 NHL entry draft. Rhett played collegiate hockey for the University of Minnesota and the Minnesota State Mavericks and played high school hockey for Chaska High School. His cousin Tyler Pitlick is also an NHL player; he currently plays for the Minnesota Wild.

== Career statistics ==
| | | | Regular season | | | | | Playoffs |
| Season | Team | League | GP | G | A | Pts | PIM | GP | G | A | Pts | PIM |
|---|---|---|---|---|---|---|---|---|---|---|---|---|
| 2013–14 | Shattuck-Saint Mary's | USHS | 53 | 9 | 25 | 34 | 32 | — | — | — | — | — |
| 2014–15 | Waterloo Black Hawks | USHL | 47 | 7 | 9 | 16 | 20 | — | — | — | — | — |
| 2015–16 | Muskegon Lumberjacks | USHL | 56 | 46 | 43 | 89 | 74 | — | — | — | — | — |
| 2016–17 | U. of Minnesota | B1G | 36 | 14 | 18 | 32 | 22 | — | — | — | — | — |
| 2017–18 | U. of Minnesota | B1G | 38 | 12 | 19 | 31 | 32 | — | — | — | — | — |
| 2018–19 | U. of Minnesota | B1G | 38 | 21 | 24 | 45 | 30 | — | — | — | — | — |
| 2018–19 | Nashville Predators | NHL | 1 | 0 | 0 | 0 | 2 | — | — | — | — | — |
| 2019–20 | Milwaukee Admirals | AHL | 63 | 20 | 16 | 36 | 40 | — | — | — | — | — |
| 2020–21 | Nashville Predators | NHL | 10 | 0 | 2 | 2 | 4 | — | — | — | — | — |
| 2020–21 | Chicago Wolves | AHL | 8 | 8 | 2 | 10 | 4 | — | — | — | — | — |
| 2021–22 | Minnesota Wild | NHL | 20 | 6 | 5 | 11 | 12 | — | — | — | — | — |
| 2021–22 | Montreal Canadiens | NHL | 46 | 9 | 17 | 26 | 12 | — | — | — | — | — |
| 2022–23 | Montreal Canadiens | NHL | 46 | 6 | 9 | 15 | 22 | — | — | — | — | — |
| 2022–23 | Laval Rocket | AHL | 18 | 5 | 17 | 22 | 20 | — | — | — | — | — |
| 2023–24 | Wilkes-Barre/Scranton Penguins | AHL | 32 | 8 | 16 | 24 | 10 | — | — | — | — | — |
| 2023–24 | Chicago Blackhawks | NHL | 9 | 0 | 0 | 0 | 2 | — | — | — | — | — |
| 2023–24 | Rockford IceHogs | AHL | 27 | 14 | 19 | 33 | 16 | 4 | 1 | 4 | 5 | 2 |
| 2024–25 | San Jose Barracuda | AHL | 18 | 2 | 11 | 13 | 6 | — | — | — | — | — |
| 2025–26 | Bakersfield Condors | AHL | 24 | 6 | 9 | 15 | 4 | — | — | — | — | — |
| 2025–26 | Rockford IceHogs | AHL | 45 | 16 | 19 | 35 | 38 | — | — | — | — | — |
| NHL totals | | | 132 | 21 | 33 | 54 | 54 | — | — | — | — | — |

== Awards and honors ==
| Award | Year | Ref |
USHL
| Dave Tyler Junior Player of the Year Award | 2016 | |
| USHL Player of the Year | 2016 | |
| USHL Forward of the Year | 2016 | |
| First Team All-USHL | 2016 | |
College
| All-Big Ten Freshman Team | 2017 | |
| Academic All-Big Ten | 2018, 2019 | |
| All-Big Ten First Team | 2019 | |
| AHCA First-Team All-American | 2019 | |
