= 2022–23 Anaheim Ducks season =

Anaheim Ducks season

2022–23 Anaheim Ducks
- Division: 8th Pacific
- Conference: 16th Western
- 2022–23 record: 23–47–12
- Home record: 12–25–4
- Road record: 11–22–8
- Goals for: 209
- Goals against: 338

Team information
- General manager: Pat Verbeek
- Coach: Dallas Eakins
- Captain: Vacant
- Alternate captains: Cam Fowler; Adam Henrique; Jakob Silfverberg
- Arena: Honda Center
- Average attendance: 14,953
- Minor league affiliates: San Diego Gulls (AHL); Tulsa Oilers (ECHL)

Team leaders
- Goals: Troy Terry; Trevor Zegras (23)
- Assists: Trevor Zegras (42)
- Points: Trevor Zegras (65)
- Penalty minutes: Trevor Zegras (88)
- Plus/minus: Scott Harrington (+1)
- Wins: John Gibson (14)
- Goals against average: Anthony Stolarz (3.73)

The 2022–23 Anaheim Ducks season was the 30th season for the National Hockey League (NHL) franchise that was established on June 15, 1993.

The Ducks attempted to improve on a disappointing 2021–22 campaign (a 31–37–14 record; 76 points) and return to the playoffs for the first time since 2018, when they were swept in the first round by the San Jose Sharks. This is also the first season without longtime captain Ryan Getzlaf as he retired at the end of the 2021–22 season. This is the first season the Ducks have entered without a captain. The Ducks were eliminated from playoff contention on March 19, 2023, after a loss to the Vancouver Canucks and finished with a worse record than the previous season.

This is the first full season for the Ducks under general manager Pat Verbeek as former general manager Bob Murray was placed on administrative leave by the team pending the results of an ongoing investigation. On November 10, 2021, Jeff Solomon was named acting general manager but was then the interim general manager when Murray resigned. Then on February 3, 2022, the Ducks named Pat Verbeek the permanent general manager.

The Ducks finished the season with a goal differential of –129, the worst for any team in the league since the 1999–2000 Atlanta Thrashers.

== Standings ==
=== Divisional standings ===
Pacific Division
| Pos | Team | GP | W | L | OTL | RW | GF | GA | GD | Pts |
|---|---|---|---|---|---|---|---|---|---|---|
| 1 | z – Vegas Golden Knights | 82 | 51 | 22 | 9 | 38 | 272 | 229 | +43 | 111 |
| 2 | x – Edmonton Oilers | 82 | 50 | 23 | 9 | 45 | 325 | 260 | +65 | 109 |
| 3 | x – Los Angeles Kings | 82 | 47 | 25 | 10 | 37 | 280 | 257 | +23 | 104 |
| 4 | x – Seattle Kraken | 82 | 46 | 28 | 8 | 37 | 289 | 256 | +33 | 100 |
| 5 | Calgary Flames | 82 | 38 | 27 | 17 | 31 | 260 | 252 | +8 | 93 |
| 6 | Vancouver Canucks | 82 | 38 | 37 | 7 | 24 | 276 | 298 | −22 | 83 |
| 7 | San Jose Sharks | 82 | 22 | 44 | 16 | 16 | 234 | 321 | −87 | 60 |
| 8 | Anaheim Ducks | 82 | 23 | 47 | 12 | 13 | 209 | 338 | −129 | 58 |

Source: National Hockey League
Rules for classification: 1) Fewer number of games played (GP, only during regular season); 2) Greater number of regulation wins (RW); 3) Greater number of wins in regulation and overtime, excluding shootout wins (ROW); 4) Greater number of total wins, including shootouts (W); 5) Greater number of points earned in head-to-head play; if teams played an uneven number of head-to-head games, the result of the first game on the home ice of the team with the extra home game is discarded; 6) Greater goal differential (GD); 7) Greater number of goals scored (GF)
x – Clinched playoff spot; z – Clinched conference

=== Conference standings ===
Western Conference Wild Card
| Pos | Div | Team | GP | W | L | OTL | RW | GF | GA | GD | Pts |
|---|---|---|---|---|---|---|---|---|---|---|---|
| 1 | PA | x – Seattle Kraken | 82 | 46 | 28 | 8 | 37 | 289 | 256 | +33 | 100 |
| 2 | CE | x – Winnipeg Jets | 82 | 46 | 33 | 3 | 36 | 247 | 225 | +22 | 95 |
| 3 | PA | Calgary Flames | 82 | 38 | 27 | 17 | 31 | 260 | 252 | +8 | 93 |
| 4 | CE | Nashville Predators | 82 | 42 | 32 | 8 | 29 | 229 | 238 | −9 | 92 |
| 5 | PA | Vancouver Canucks | 82 | 38 | 37 | 7 | 24 | 276 | 298 | −22 | 83 |
| 6 | CE | St. Louis Blues | 82 | 37 | 38 | 7 | 27 | 263 | 301 | −38 | 81 |
| 7 | CE | Arizona Coyotes | 82 | 28 | 40 | 14 | 20 | 228 | 299 | −71 | 70 |
| 8 | PA | San Jose Sharks | 82 | 22 | 44 | 16 | 16 | 234 | 321 | −87 | 60 |
| 9 | CE | Chicago Blackhawks | 82 | 26 | 49 | 7 | 18 | 204 | 301 | −97 | 59 |
| 10 | PA | Anaheim Ducks | 82 | 23 | 47 | 12 | 13 | 209 | 338 | −129 | 58 |

Source: National Hockey League
Rules for classification: 1) Fewer number of games played (GP, only during regular season); 2) Greater number of regulation wins (RW); 3) Greater number of wins in regulation and overtime, excluding shootout wins (ROW); 4) Greater number of total wins, including shootouts (W); 5) Greater number of points earned in head-to-head play; if teams played an uneven number of head-to-head games, the result of the first game on the home ice of the team with the extra home game is discarded; 6) Greater goal differential (GD); 7) Greater number of goals scored (GF)
x – Clinched playoff spot

== Schedule and results ==
=== Preseason ===
The preseason schedule was published on June 30, 2022.

2022 preseason game log: 4–3–0 (home: 3–0–0; road: 1–3–0)
| # | Date | Away | Score | Home | Decision | Location | Attendance | Record | Recap |
|---|---|---|---|---|---|---|---|---|---|
| 1 | September 25 | Anaheim | 3–2 | Arizona | Dostal | Tucson Convention Center | 4,780 | 1–0–0 |
| 2 | September 27 | Anaheim | 4–5 | San Jose | Stolarz | SAP Center | 8,030 | 1–1–0 |
| 3 | September 28 | Arizona | 1–3 | Anaheim | Dostal | Honda Center | 9,214 | 2–1–0 |
| 4 | September 30 | San Jose | 1–4 | Anaheim | Gibson | Honda Center | 13,616 | 3–1–0 |
| 5 | October 2 | Anaheim | 1–2 | Los Angeles | Gibson | Crypto.com Arena | 12,031 | 3–2–0 |
| 6 | October 4 | Los Angeles | 4–5 | Anaheim | Stolarz | Honda Center | 12,968 | 4–2–0 |
| 7 | October 8 | Anaheim | 3–6 | Los Angeles | Stolarz | Crypto.com Arena | 12,845 | 4–3–0 |
Legend: Win (2 points) Loss (0 points) OT/SO loss (1 point)

=== Regular season ===
The regular season schedule was released on July 6, 2022,

2022–23 game log

October: 2–6–1 (home: 2–1–0; road: 0–5–1)
| # | Date | Opponent | Score | OT | Decision | Arena | Attendance | Record | Pts | Recap |
|---|---|---|---|---|---|---|---|---|---|---|
| 1 | October 12 | Seattle Kraken | 5–4 | OT | Gibson | Honda Center | 17,530 | 1–0–0 | 2 |
| 2 | October 15 | @ New York Islanders | 1–7 | | Gibson | UBS Arena | 16,487 | 1–1–0 | 2 |
| 3 | October 17 | @ New York Rangers | 4–6 | | Gibson | Madison Square Garden | 18,006 | 1–2–0 | 2 |
| 4 | October 18 | @ New Jersey Devils | 2–4 | | Stolarz | Prudential Center | 10,130 | 1–3–0 | 2 |
| 5 | October 20 | @ Boston Bruins | 1–2 | SO | Gibson | TD Garden | 17,850 | 1–3–1 | 3 |
| 6 | October 23 | @ Detroit Red Wings | 1–5 | | Gibson | Little Caesars Arena | 17,932 | 1–4–1 | 3 |
| 7 | October 26 | Tampa Bay Lightning | 2–4 | | Gibson | Honda Center | 14,889 | 1–5–1 | 3 |
| 8 | October 28 | @ Vegas Golden Knights | 0–4 | | Gibson | T-Mobile Arena | 18,036 | 1–6–1 | 3 |
| 9 | October 30 | Toronto Maple Leafs | 4–3 | OT | Gibson | Honda Center | 16,084 | 2–6–1 | 5 |

November: 4–9–1 (home: 2–5–0; road: 2–4–1)
| # | Date | Opponent | Score | OT | Decision | Arena | Attendance | Record | Pts | Recap |
|---|---|---|---|---|---|---|---|---|---|---|
| 10 | November 1 | @ San Jose Sharks | 6–5 | SO | Stolarz | SAP Center | 10,058 | 3–6–1 | 7 |
| 11 | November 3 | @ Vancouver Canucks | 5–8 | | Gibson | Rogers Arena | 18,760 | 3–7–1 | 7 |
| 12 | November 5 | @ San Jose Sharks | 5–4 | SO | Stolarz | SAP Center | 17,562 | 4–7–1 | 9 |
| 13 | November 6 | Florida Panthers | 3–5 | | Gibson | Honda Center | 15,174 | 4–8–1 | 9 |
| 14 | November 9 | Minnesota Wild | 1–4 | | Gibson | Honda Center | 14,803 | 4–9–1 | 9 |
| 15 | November 12 | Chicago Blackhawks | 2–3 | | Stolarz | Honda Center | 15,184 | 4–10–1 | 9 |
| 16 | November 15 | Detroit Red Wings | 3–2 | OT | Gibson | Honda Center | 15,198 | 5–10–1 | 11 |
| 17 | November 17 | @ Winnipeg Jets | 2–3 | | Gibson | Canada Life Centre | 14,278 | 5–11–1 | 11 |
| 18 | November 19 | @ St. Louis Blues | 2–6 | | Gibson | Enterprise Center | 18,096 | 5–12–1 | 11 |
| 19 | November 21 | @ St. Louis Blues | 1–3 | | Gibson | Enterprise Center | 18,096 | 5–13–1 | 11 |
| 20 | November 23 | New York Rangers | 3–2 | | Gibson | Honda Center | 13,759 | 6–13–1 | 13 |
| 21 | November 25 | Ottawa Senators | 1–5 | | Stolarz | Honda Center | 14,278 | 6–14–1 | 13 |
| 22 | November 27 | Seattle Kraken | 4–5 | | Gibson | Honda Center | 14,324 | 6–15–1 | 13 |
| 23 | November 29 | @ Nashville Predators | 1–2 | OT | Gibson | Bridgestone Arena | 17,159 | 6–15–2 | 14 |

December: 4–8–2 (home: 2–3–1; road: 2–5–1)
| # | Date | Opponent | Score | OT | Decision | Arena | Attendance | Record | Pts | Recap |
|---|---|---|---|---|---|---|---|---|---|---|
| 24 | December 1 | @ Dallas Stars | 0–5 | | Stolarz | American Airlines Center | 18,012 | 6–16–2 | 14 |
| 25 | December 3 | @ Minnesota Wild | 4–5 | SO | Gibson | Xcel Energy Center | 17,822 | 6–16–3 | 15 |
| 26 | December 4 | @ Winnipeg Jets | 2–5 | | Stolarz | Canada Life Centre | 13,444 | 6–17–3 | 15 |
| 27 | December 6 | Carolina Hurricanes | 4–3 | OT | Gibson | Honda Center | 14,576 | 7–17–3 | 17 |
| 28 | December 9 | San Jose Sharks | 1–6 | | Gibson | Honda Center | 14,487 | 7–18–3 | 17 |
| 29 | December 12 | @ Ottawa Senators | 0–3 | | Dostal | Canadian Tire Centre | 14,204 | 7–19–3 | 17 |
| 30 | December 13 | @ Toronto Maple Leafs | 0–7 | | Gibson | Scotiabank Arena | 18,477 | 7–20–3 | 17 |
| 31 | December 15 | @ Montreal Canadiens | 5–2 | | Dostal | Bell Centre | 21,105 | 8–20–3 | 19 |
| 32 | December 17 | @ Edmonton Oilers | 4–3 | | Dostal | Rogers Place | 18,296 | 9–20–3 | 21 |
| 33 | December 20 | @ Los Angeles Kings | 1–4 | | Dostal | Crypto.com Arena | 18,230 | 9–21–3 | 21 |
| 34 | December 21 | Minnesota Wild | 1–4 | | Dostal | Honda Center | 14,961 | 9–22–3 | 21 |
| 35 | December 23 | Calgary Flames | 2–3 | OT | Dostal | Honda Center | 16,094 | 9–22–4 | 22 |
| 36 | December 28 | Vegas Golden Knights | 3–2 | SO | Gibson | Honda Center | 15,156 | 10–22–4 | 24 |
| 37 | December 30 | Nashville Predators | 1–6 | | Gibson | Honda Center | 14,890 | 10–23–4 | 24 |

January: 6–6–1 (home: 3–4–0; road: 3–2–1)
| # | Date | Opponent | Score | OT | Decision | Arena | Attendance | Record | Pts | Recap |
|---|---|---|---|---|---|---|---|---|---|---|
| 38 | January 2 | Philadelphia Flyers | 1–4 | | Gibson | Honda Center | 13,600 | 10–24–4 | 24 |
| 39 | January 4 | Dallas Stars | 2–0 | | Gibson | Honda Center | 13,179 | 11–24–4 | 26 |
| 40 | January 6 | San Jose Sharks | 5–4 | OT | Stolarz | Honda Center | 16,281 | 12–24–4 | 28 |
| 41 | January 8 | Boston Bruins | 1–7 | | Gibson | Honda Center | 16,127 | 12–25–4 | 28 |
| 42 | January 11 | Edmonton Oilers | 2–6 | | Gibson | Honda Center | 16,963 | 12–26–4 | 28 |
| 43 | January 13 | New Jersey Devils | 2–6 | | Gibson | Honda Center | 16,167 | 12–27–4 | 28 |
| 44 | January 16 | @ Pittsburgh Penguins | 3–4 | OT | Gibson | PPG Paints Arena | 17,784 | 12–27–5 | 29 |
| 45 | January 17 | @ Philadelphia Flyers | 2–5 | | Stolarz | Wells Fargo Center | 16,312 | 12–28–5 | 29 |
| 46 | January 19 | @ Columbus Blue Jackets | 5–3 | | Gibson | Nationwide Arena | 16,017 | 13–28–5 | 31 |
| 47 | January 21 | @ Buffalo Sabres | 3–6 | | Gibson | KeyBank Center | 19,070 | 13–29–5 | 31 |
| 48 | January 24 | @ Arizona Coyotes | 5–2 | | Stolarz | Mullett Arena | 4,600 | 14–29–5 | 33 |
| 49 | January 26 | @ Colorado Avalanche | 5–3 | | Gibson | Ball Arena | 18,124 | 15–29–5 | 35 |
| 50 | January 28 | Arizona Coyotes | 2–1 | OT | Gibson | Honda Center | 16,126 | 16–29–5 | 37 |

February: 4–5–2 (home: 1–3–0; road: 3–2–2)
| # | Date | Opponent | Score | OT | Decision | Arena | Attendance | Record | Pts | Recap |
|---|---|---|---|---|---|---|---|---|---|---|
| 51 | February 6 | @ Dallas Stars | 2–3 | SO | Gibson | American Airlines Center | 18,145 | 16–29–6 | 38 |
| 52 | February 7 | @ Chicago Blackhawks | 3–2 | OT | Stolarz | United Center | 18,292 | 17–29–6 | 40 |
| 53 | February 10 | Pittsburgh Penguins | 3–6 | | Gibson | Honda Center | 15,026 | 17–30–6 | 40 |
| 54 | February 12 | @ Vegas Golden Knights | 2–7 | | Gibson | T-Mobile Arena | 17,504 | 17–31–6 | 40 |
| 55 | February 15 | Buffalo Sabres | 3–7 | | Dostal | Honda Center | 15,165 | 17–32–6 | 40 |
| 56 | February 17 | Los Angeles Kings | 3–6 | | Gibson | Honda Center | 17,272 | 17–33–6 | 40 |
| 57 | February 20 | @ Florida Panthers | 3–4 | OT | Gibson | FLA Live Arena | 16,525 | 17–33–7 | 41 |
| 58 | February 21 | @ Tampa Bay Lightning | 1–6 | | Dostal | Amalie Arena | 19,092 | 17–34–7 | 41 |
| 59 | February 23 | @ Washington Capitals | 4–2 | | Gibson | Capital One Arena | 18,573 | 18–34–7 | 43 |
| 60 | February 25 | @ Carolina Hurricanes | 3–2 | | Gibson | PNC Arena | 18,818 | 19–34–7 | 45 |
| 61 | February 27 | Chicago Blackhawks | 4–2 | | Dostal | Honda Center | 14,462 | 20–34–7 | 47 |

March: 3–8–3 (home: 2–6–2; road: 1–2–1)
| # | Date | Opponent | Score | OT | Decision | Arena | Attendance | Record | Pts | Recap |
|---|---|---|---|---|---|---|---|---|---|---|
| 62 | March 1 | Washington Capitals | 2–3 | OT | Gibson | Honda Center | 14,279 | 20–34–8 | 48 |
| 63 | March 3 | Montreal Canadiens | 3–2 | | Gibson | Honda Center | 14,391 | 21–34–8 | 50 |
| 64 | March 7 | @ Seattle Kraken | 2–5 | | Gibson | Climate Pledge Arena | 17,151 | 21–35–8 | 50 |
| 65 | March 8 | @ Vancouver Canucks | 2–3 | OT | Dostal | Rogers Arena | 18,617 | 21–35–9 | 51 |
| 66 | March 10 | Calgary Flames | 3–1 | | Gibson | Scotiabank Saddledome | 18,013 | 22–35–9 | 53 |
| 67 | March 12 | Nashville Predators | 4–5 | OT | Gibson | Honda Center | 15,098 | 22–35–10 | 54 |
| 68 | March 15 | New York Islanders | 3–6 | | Gibson | Honda Center | 13,552 | 22–36–10 | 54 |
| 69 | March 17 | Columbus Blue Jackets | 7–4 | | Dostal | Honda Center | 13,475 | 23–36–10 | 56 |
| 70 | March 19 | Vancouver Canucks | 1–2 | | Gibson | Honda Center | 14,842 | 23–37–10 | 56 |
| 71 | March 21 | Calgary Flames | 1–5 | | Gibson | Honda Center | 12,974 | 23–38–10 | 56 |
| 72 | March 23 | Winnipeg Jets | 2–3 | | Dostal | Honda Center | 12,331 | 23–39–10 | 56 |
| 73 | March 25 | St. Louis Blues | 3–6 | | Gibson | Honda Center | 15,237 | 23–40–10 | 56 |
| 74 | March 27 | Colorado Avalanche | 1–5 | | Gibson | Honda Center | 13,158 | 23–41–10 | 56 |
| 75 | March 30 | @ Seattle Kraken | 1–4 | | Dostal | Climate Pledge Arena | 17,151 | 23–42–10 | 56 |

April: 0–5–2 (home: 0–3–1; road: 0–2–1)
| # | Date | Opponent | Score | OT | Decision | Arena | Attendance | Record | Pts | Recap |
|---|---|---|---|---|---|---|---|---|---|---|
| 76 | April 1 | @ Edmonton Oilers | 0–6 | | Gibson | Rogers Place | 18,347 | 23–43–10 | 56 |
| 77 | April 2 | @ Calgary Flames | 4–5 | | Dostal | Scotiabank Saddledome | 17,439 | 23–44–10 | 56 |
| 78 | April 5 | Edmonton Oilers | 1–3 | | Dostal | Honda Center | 16,018 | 23–45–10 | 56 |
| 79 | April 8 | @ Arizona Coyotes | 4–5 | OT | Eriksson Ek | Mullett Arena | 4,600 | 23–45–11 | 57 |
| 80 | April 9 | Colorado Avalanche | 4–5 | OT | Dostal | Honda Center | 13,992 | 23–45–12 | 58 |
| 81 | April 11 | Vancouver Canucks | 2–3 | | Dostal | Honda Center | 14,803 | 23–46–12 | 58 |
| 82 | April 13 | Los Angeles Kings | 3–5 | | Gibson | Honda Center | 17,174 | 23–47–12 | 58 |

Legend: Win (2 points) Loss (0 points) OT/SO loss (1 point)

== Player statistics ==
=== Skaters ===
Regular season
| Player | GP | G | A | Pts | +/− | PIM |
|---|---|---|---|---|---|---|
| Trevor Zegras | 81 | 23 | 42 | 65 | –24 | 88 |
| Troy Terry | 70 | 23 | 38 | 61 | –8 | 22 |
| Cam Fowler | 82 | 10 | 38 | 48 | –23 | 14 |
| Mason McTavish | 80 | 17 | 26 | 43 | –19 | 44 |
| Frank Vatrano | 81 | 22 | 19 | 41 | –29 | 66 |
| Ryan Strome | 82 | 15 | 26 | 41 | –30 | 79 |
| Adam Henrique | 62 | 22 | 16 | 38 | –8 | 22 |
| Kevin Shattenkirk | 75 | 4 | 23 | 27 | –20 | 56 |
| Jakob Silfverberg | 81 | 10 | 16 | 26 | –20 | 32 |
| John Klingberg^{‡} | 50 | 8 | 16 | 24 | –28 | 30 |
| Max Jones | 69 | 9 | 10 | 19 | –21 | 77 |
| Max Comtois | 64 | 9 | 10 | 19 | –20 | 76 |
| Derek Grant | 46 | 5 | 13 | 18 | –4 | 26 |
| Dmitry Kulikov^{‡} | 61 | 3 | 12 | 15 | –11 | 30 |
| Isac Lundeström | 61 | 4 | 10 | 14 | –13 | 2 |
| Simon Benoit | 78 | 3 | 7 | 10 | –29 | 60 |
| Brett Leason | 54 | 6 | 3 | 9 | –21 | 14 |
| Jayson Megna^{†} | 41 | 2 | 6 | 8 | –19 | 4 |
| Sam Carrick | 52 | 3 | 4 | 7 | –17 | 86 |
| Colton White | 46 | 0 | 6 | 6 | –17 | 8 |
| Scott Harrington^{†} | 17 | 3 | 1 | 4 | +1 | 2 |
| Nathan Beaulieu | 52 | 0 | 4 | 4 | –23 | 39 |
| Brock McGinn^{†} | 15 | 2 | 1 | 3 | –6 | 0 |
| Pavol Regenda | 14 | 1 | 2 | 3 | –3 | 4 |
| Urho Vaakanainen | 23 | 0 | 2 | 2 | –16 | 0 |
| Drew Helleson | 3 | 1 | 0 | 1 | 0 | 2 |
| Nikita Nesterenko^{†} | 9 | 1 | 0 | 1 | –3 | 0 |
| Justin Kirkland | 7 | 0 | 0 | 0 | –3 | 0 |
| Glenn Gawdin | 3 | 0 | 0 | 0 | –1 | 0 |
| Austin Strand^{‡} | 5 | 0 | 0 | 0 | –2 | 2 |
| Benoit-Olivier Groulx | 2 | 0 | 0 | 0 | 0 | 0 |
| Jackson LaCombe^{†} | 2 | 0 | 0 | 0 | –1 | 0 |
| Jamie Drysdale | 8 | 0 | 0 | 0 | –3 | 2 |

=== Goaltenders ===
Regular season
| Player | GP | GS | TOI | W | L | OT | GA | GAA | SA | SV% | SO | G | A | PIM |
|---|---|---|---|---|---|---|---|---|---|---|---|---|---|---|
| John Gibson | 53 | 52 | 3,004:55 | 14 | 31 | 8 | 200 | 3,99 | 1,983 | .899 | 1 | 0 | 2 | 12 |
| Anthony Stolarz | 19 | 12 | 820:03 | 5 | 6 | 0 | 51 | 3,73 | 494 | .899 | 0 | 0 | 0 | 0 |
| Lukáš Dostál | 19 | 17 | 1,062:43 | 4 | 10 | 3 | 67 | 3,78 | 679 | .901 | 0 | 0 | 0 | 0 |
| Olle Eriksson Ek | 1 | 1 | 63:59 | 0 | 0 | 1 | 5 | 4,69 | 39 | .872 | 0 | 0 | 0 | 0 |

^{†}Denotes player spent time with another team before joining the Ducks. Stats reflect time with the Ducks only.
^{‡}Denotes player was traded mid-season. Stats reflect time with the Ducks only.
Bold/italics denotes franchise record.

== Transactions ==
The Ducks have been involved in the following transactions during the 2022–23 season.

=== Key ===
† Contract is entry-level.
‡ Contract initially takes effect in the 2023-24 season.

=== Trades ===
| Date | Details | | Ref |
|---|---|---|---|
| August 31, 2022 | To Minnesota Wild Future considerations | To Anaheim Ducks Dmitry Kulikov | |
| December 19, 2022 | To Detroit Red Wings Danny O'Regan | To Anaheim Ducks Michael Del Zotto | |
| December 19, 2022 | To Florida Panthers Givani Smith | To Anaheim Ducks Michael Del Zotto | |
| February 23, 2023 | To Chicago Blackhawks Hunter Drew | To Anaheim Ducks Josiah Slavin | |
| February 28, 2023 | To San Jose Sharks Henry Thrun | To Anaheim Ducks 3rd-round pick in 2024 | |
| March 2, 2023 | To Chicago Blackhawks Maxim Golod | To Anaheim Ducks Dylan Sikura | |
| March 3, 2023 | To Buffalo Sabres Austin Strand | To Anaheim Ducks Chase Priskie | |
| March 3, 2023 | To Pittsburgh Penguins Dmitry Kulikov^{1} | To Anaheim Ducks Brock McGinn; 3rd-round pick in 2024 | |
| March 3, 2023 | To Minnesota Wild John Klingberg^{1} | To Anaheim Ducks Rights to Nikita Nesterenko; Andrej Sustr; 4th-round pick in 2025 | |
| March 31, 2023 | To Pittsburgh Penguins Thimo Nickl | To Anaheim Ducks Judd Caulfield | |
| June 27, 2023 | To San Jose Sharks Andrej Sustr | To Anaheim Ducks Andrew Agozzino | |

==== Notes ====
- Anaheim retains 50% of Kulikov's salary.
- Anaheim retains 50% of Klingberg's salary.

=== Players acquired ===
| Date | Player | Former team | Term | Via | Ref |
|---|---|---|---|---|---|
| July 13, 2022 | Ryan Strome | New York Rangers | 5-year | Free agency | |
| July 13, 2022 | Frank Vatrano | New York Rangers | 3-year | Free agency | |
| July 14, 2022 | Chase De Leo | New Jersey Devils | 2-year | Free agency | |
| July 14, 2022 | Glenn Gawdin | Calgary Flames | 2-year | Free agency | |
| July 14, 2022 | Justin Kirkland | Calgary Flames | 1-year | Free agency | |
| July 14, 2022 | Austin Strand | Los Angeles Kings | 1-year | Free agency | |
| July 14, 2022 | Colton White | New Jersey Devils | 2-year | Free agency | |
| July 27, 2022 | Olli Juolevi | Detroit Red Wings | 1-year | Free agency | |
| July 29, 2022 | John Klingberg | Dallas Stars | 1-year | Free agency | |
| October 1, 2022 | Nathan Beaulieu | Pittsburgh Penguins | 1-year | Free agency | |
| October 10, 2022 | Brett Leason | Washington Capitals | | Waivers | |
| December 6, 2022 | Jayson Megna | Colorado Avalanche | | Waivers | |
| February 28, 2023 | Scott Harrington | New Jersey Devils | | Waivers | |
| March 2, 2023 | Jaxsen Wiebe | Prince George Cougars (WHL) | 3-year†‡ | Free agency | |

=== Players lost ===
| Date | Player | New team | Term | Via | Ref |
|---|---|---|---|---|---|
| July 13, 2022 | Vinni Lettieri | Boston Bruins | 1-year | Free agency | |
| July 13, 2022 | Andrej Sustr | Minnesota Wild | 1-year | Free agency | |
| July 13, 2022 | Brogan Rafferty | Seattle Kraken | 1-year | Free agency | |
| July 14, 2022 | Jacob Larsson | Ottawa Senators | 1-year | Free agency | |
| July 15, 2022 | Gerald Mayhew | Florida Panthers | 1-year | Free agency | |
| July 25, 2022 | Buddy Robinson | Chicago Blackhawks | 1-year | Free agency | |
| July 25, 2022 | Trevor Carrick | Tampa Bay Lightning | 1-year | Free agency | |
| July 29, 2022 | Jack Badini | Toronto Marlies (AHL) | 1-year | Free agency | |
| August 8, 2022 | Greg Pateryn | | | Retirement | |
| August 30, 2022 | Sam Steel | Minnesota Wild | 1-year | Free agency | |
| September 10, 2022 | Dominik Simon | HC Sparta Praha (ELH) | 2-year | Free agency | |
| October 9, 2022 | Zach Aston-Reese | Toronto Maple Leafs | 1-year | Free agency | |
| October 10, 2022 | Josh Mahura | Florida Panthers | | Waivers | |
| October 13, 2022 | Roman Durny | HC Košice (Slovak Extraliga) | 1-month | Free agency | |
| October 16, 2022 | Sonny Milano | Washington Capitals | 1-year | Free agency | |
| May 8, 2023 | Olle Eriksson Ek | Modo Hockey (SHL) | 2-year‡ | Free agency | |
| May 17, 2023 | Axel Andersson | Djurgårdens IF (HockeyAllsvenskan) | 2-year‡ | Free agency | |

=== Signings ===
| Date | Player | Term | Ref |
|---|---|---|---|
| July 16, 2022 | Pavel Mintyukov | 3-year† | |
| July 22, 2022 | Simon Benoit | 1-year | |
| July 22, 2022 | Olle Eriksson Ek | 1-year | |
| July 22, 2022 | Urho Vaakanainen | 2-year | |
| July 25, 2022 | Isac Lundestrom | 2-year | |
| July 28, 2022 | Nathan Gaucher | 3-year† | |
| September 28, 2022 | Tyson Hinds | 3-year† | |
| December 30, 2022 | Gage Alexander | 3-year† | |
| March 15, 2023 | Nikita Nesterenko | 2-year† | |
| April 2, 2023 | Judd Caulfield | 2-year†‡ | |
| April 10, 2023 | Jackson LaCombe | 2-year† | |

== Draft picks ==
Below are the Anaheim Ducks selections at the 2022 NHL entry draft, which was held on July 7 and 8, 2022, on ESPN, ESPN+, SN, and NHL Network at the Bell Centre in Montreal, Quebec.

| Round | # | Player | Pos | Nationality | College/Junior/Club team (League) |
|---|---|---|---|---|---|
| 1 | 10 | Pavel Mintyukov | D | Russia | Saginaw Spirit (OHL) |
| 1 | 22 | Nathan Gaucher | C | Canada | Quebec Remparts (QMJHL) |
| 2 | 42 | Noah Warren | D | Canada | Gatineau Olympiques (QMJHL) |
| 2 | 53 | Tristan Luneau | D | Canada | Gatineau Olympiques (QMJHL) |
| 4 | 107 | Benjamin King | C | Canada | Red Deer Rebels (WHL) |
| 5 | 139 | Connor Hvidston | LW | Canada | Swift Current Broncos (WHL) |
| 5 | 154 | Michael Callow | RW | United States | St. Sebastian's School (USHS-MA) |
| 6 | 178 | Vyacheslav Buteyets | G | Russia | Chelmet Chelyabinsk (VHL) |
