= 2022–23 Columbus Blue Jackets season =

National Hockey League season

2022–23 Columbus Blue Jackets
- Division: 8th Metropolitan
- Conference: 16th Eastern
- 2022–23 record: 25–48–9
- Home record: 16–23–2
- Road record: 9–25–7
- Goals for: 214
- Goals against: 330

Team information
- General manager: Jarmo Kekäläinen
- Coach: Brad Larsen
- Captain: Boone Jenner
- Alternate captains: Gustav Nyquist (Oct. 12 – Feb. 28); Zach Werenski; Rotating (Feb. 28 – Apr. 14)
- Arena: Nationwide Arena
- Average attendance: 16,860
- Minor league affiliates: Cleveland Monsters (AHL); Kalamazoo Wings (ECHL)

Team leaders
- Goals: Boone Jenner (26)
- Assists: Johnny Gaudreau (53)
- Points: Johnny Gaudreau (74)
- Penalty minutes: Mathieu Olivier (81)
- Plus/minus: Samuel Knazko (0)
- Wins: Joonas Korpisalo (11)
- Goals against average: Jet Greaves (3.05)

The 2022–23 Columbus Blue Jackets season was the 23rd season for the National Hockey League (NHL) franchise that was established on June 25, 1997. On March 17, 2023, the Blue Jackets were eliminated from playoff contention for the third year in a row for the first time since the 2010–11 season and the 2012–13 season after a loss to the Anaheim Ducks. it is also the first time since the 2011–12 season

== Standings ==
=== Divisional standings ===
Metropolitan Division
Pos	Team	GP	W	L	OTL	RW	GF	GA	GD	Pts
1	y – Carolina Hurricanes	82	52	21	9	39	266	213	+53	113
2	x – New Jersey Devils	82	52	22	8	39	291	226	+65	112
3	x – New York Rangers	82	47	22	13	37	277	219	+58	107
4	x – New York Islanders	82	42	31	9	36	243	222	+21	93
5	Pittsburgh Penguins	82	40	31	11	31	262	264	−2	91
6	Washington Capitals	82	35	37	10	27	255	265	−10	80
7	Philadelphia Flyers	82	31	38	13	26	222	277	−55	75
8	Columbus Blue Jackets	82	25	48	9	15	214	330	−116	59

Source: National Hockey League
Rules for classification: 1) Fewer number of games played (GP, only during regular season); 2) Greater number of regulation wins (RW); 3) Greater number of wins in regulation and overtime, excluding shootout wins (ROW); 4) Greater number of total wins, including shootouts (W); 5) Greater number of points earned in head-to-head play; if teams played an uneven number of head-to-head games, the result of the first game on the home ice of the team with the extra home game is discarded; 6) Greater goal differential (GD); 7) Greater number of goals scored (GF)
x – Clinched playoff spot; y – Clinched division

=== Conference standings ===
Eastern Conference Wild Card
Pos	Div	Team	GP	W	L	OTL	RW	GF	GA	GD	Pts
1	ME	x – New York Islanders	82	42	31	9	36	243	222	+21	93
2	AT	x – Florida Panthers	82	42	32	8	36	290	273	+17	92
3	ME	Pittsburgh Penguins	82	40	31	11	31	262	264	−2	91
4	AT	Buffalo Sabres	82	42	33	7	30	296	300	−4	91
5	AT	Ottawa Senators	82	39	35	8	31	261	271	−10	86
6	AT	Detroit Red Wings	82	35	37	10	28	240	279	−39	80
7	ME	Washington Capitals	82	35	37	10	27	255	265	−10	80
8	ME	Philadelphia Flyers	82	31	38	13	26	222	277	−55	75
9	AT	Montreal Canadiens	82	31	45	6	21	232	307	−75	68
10	ME	Columbus Blue Jackets	82	25	48	9	15	214	330	−116	59

Source: National Hockey League
Rules for classification: 1) Fewer number of games played (GP, only during regular season); 2) Greater number of regulation wins (RW); 3) Greater number of wins in regulation and overtime, excluding shootout wins (ROW); 4) Greater number of total wins, including shootouts (W); 5) Greater number of points earned in head-to-head play; if teams played an uneven number of head-to-head games, the result of the first game on the home ice of the team with the extra home game is discarded; 6) Greater goal differential (GD); 7) Greater number of goals scored (GF)
x – Clinched playoff spot

== Schedule and results ==
=== Regular season ===
The regular season schedule was published on July 6, 2022.

2022–23 game log

October: 3–7–0 (home: 2–4–0; road: 1–3–0)
#	Date	Visitor	Score	Home	OT	Decision	Attendance	Record	Pts	Recap
1	October 12	Columbus	1–4	Carolina		Tarasov	18,824	0–1–0	0
2	October 14	Tampa Bay	5–2	Columbus		Tarasov	18,889	0–2–0	0
3	October 15	Columbus	2–5	St. Louis		Merzlikins	18,096	0–3–0	0
4	October 18	Vancouver	3–4	Columbus	OT	Merzlikins	14,060	1–3–0	2
5	October 20	Nashville	3–5	Columbus		Merzlikins	14,691	2–3–0	4
6	October 22	Pittsburgh	6–3	Columbus		Merzlikins	18,051	2–4–0	4
7	October 23	Columbus	5–1	NY Rangers		Tarasov	18,006	3–4–0	6
8	October 25	Arizona	6–3	Columbus		Tarasov	14,498	3–5–0	6
9	October 28	Boston	4–0	Columbus		Merzlikins	16,162	3–6–0	6
10	October 30	Columbus	1–7	New Jersey		Merzlikins	11,547	3–7–0	6

November: 4–5–2 (home: 4–4–1; road: 0–1–1)
#	Date	Visitor	Score	Home	OT	Decision	Attendance	Record	Pts	Recap
11	November 4^{[a]}	Columbus	3–6	Colorado		Merzlikins	12,882	3–8–0	6
12	November 5^{[a]}	Colorado	5–1	Columbus		Korpisalo	12,897	3–9–0	6
13	November 10	Philadelphia	2–5	Columbus		Korpisalo	15,490	4–9–0	8
14	November 12	Columbus	3–4	NY Islanders	OT	Korpisalo	17,255	4–9–1	9
15	November 15	Philadelphia	4–5	Columbus	OT	Korpisalo	15,713	5–9–1	11
16	November 17	Montreal	4–6	Columbus		Korpisalo	14,914	6–9–1	13
17	November 19	Detroit	6–1	Columbus		Korpisalo	18,693	6–10–1	13
18	November 20	Florida	3–5	Columbus		Tarasov	15,643	7–10–1	15
19	November 23	Montreal	3–1	Columbus		Korpisalo	14,197	7–11–1	15
20	November 25	NY Islanders	3–2	Columbus		Korpisalo	17,286	7–12–1	15
—	November 26	Columbus		Nashville	Postponed due to a water main break inside the Arena. Moved to January 17.
21	November 28	Vegas	3–2	Columbus	SO	Tarasov	13,771	7–12–2	16

December: 4–10–0 (home: 3–3–0; road: 1–7–0)
#	Date	Visitor	Score	Home	OT	Decision	Attendance	Record	Pts	Recap
22	December 2	Columbus	4–1	Winnipeg		Korpisalo	13,240	8–12–2	18
23	December 4	Detroit	4–2	Columbus		Korpisalo	16,087	8–13–2	18
24	December 6	Columbus	1–4	Pittsburgh		Merzlikins	15,867	8–14–2	18
25	December 7	Buffalo	9–4	Columbus		Merzlikins	15,659	8–15–2	18
26	December 9	Calgary	1–3	Columbus		Merzlikins	16,902	9–15–2	20
27	December 11	Los Angeles	5–6	Columbus	OT	Merzlikins	14,560	10–15–2	22
28	December 13	Columbus	0–4	Florida		Merzlikins	15,819	10–16–2	22
29	December 15	Columbus	1–4	Tampa Bay		Tarasov	19,092	10–17–2	22
30	December 17	Columbus	2–4	Boston		Tarasov	17,850	10–18–2	22
31	December 19	Dallas	2–1	Columbus		Tarasov	16,402	10–19–2	22
32	December 20	Columbus	3–5	Philadelphia		Tarasov	19,432	10–20–2	22
33	December 23	Columbus	2–5	Chicago		Tarasov	17,108	10–21–2	22
—	December 27	Buffalo		Columbus	Postponed due to winter storm. Moved to April 14.
34	December 29	Columbus	1–2	NY Islanders		Korpisalo	17,255	10–22–2	22
35	December 31	Chicago	1–4	Columbus		Korpisalo	18,280	11–22–2	24

January: 4–10–2 (home: 2–4–1; road: 2–6–1)
#	Date	Visitor	Score	Home	OT	Decision	Attendance	Record	Pts	Recap
36	January 3	Columbus	0–4	Ottawa		Korpisalo	14,457	11–23–2	24
37	January 5	Washington	6–2	Columbus		Merzlikins	17,924	11–24–2	24
38	January 7	Carolina	3–4	Columbus	SO	Korpisalo	18,663	12–24–2	26
39	January 8	Columbus	0–1	Washington		Merzlikins	18,573	12–25–2	26
40	January 10	Columbus	3–6	Tampa Bay		Merzlikins	19,092	12–26–2	26
41	January 12	Carolina	6–2	Columbus		Korpisalo	15,766	12–27–2	26
42	January 14	Columbus	4–3	Detroit		Merzlikins	19,515	13–27–2	28
43	January 16	NY Rangers	3–1	Columbus		Merzlikins	17,024	13–28–2	28
44	January 17	Columbus	1–2	Nashville		Tarasov	17,159	13–29–2	28
45	January 19	Anaheim	5–3	Columbus		Merzlikins	16,017	13–30–2	28
46	January 21	San Jose	3–5	Columbus		Korpisalo	18,807	14–30–2	30
47	January 23	Columbus	3–4	Calgary	OT	Korpisalo	17,697	14–30–3	31
48	January 25	Columbus	3–2	Edmonton	OT	Korpisalo	16,986	15–30–3	33
49	January 27	Columbus	2–5	Vancouver		Korpisalo	18,700	15–31–3	33
50	January 28	Columbus	1–3	Seattle		Merzlikins	17,151	15–32–3	33
51	January 31	Washington	4–3	Columbus	OT	Korpisalo	17,879	15–32–4	34

February: 5–3–2 (home: 2–3–0; road: 3–0–2)
#	Date	Visitor	Score	Home	OT	Decision	Attendance	Record	Pts	Recap
52	February 10	Toronto	3–0	Columbus		Korpisalo	18,860	15–33–4	34
53	February 11	Columbus	4–3	Toronto		Merzlikins	18,893	16–33–4	36
54	February 14	New Jersey	3–2	Columbus		Merzlikins	15,840	16–34–4	36
55	February 16	Winnipeg	1–3	Columbus		Korpisalo	16,032	17–34–4	38
56	February 18	Columbus	4–1	Dallas		Korpisalo	18,532	18–34–4	40
57	February 19	Columbus	2–3	Arizona	OT	Merzlikins	4,600	18–34–5	41
58	February 23	Minnesota	2–0	Columbus		Korpisalo	17,997	18–35–5	41
59	February 25	Edmonton	5–6	Columbus		Korpisalo	19,004	19–35–5	43
60	February 26	Columbus	2–3	Minnesota	OT	Merzlikins	19,063	19–35–6	44
61	February 28	Columbus	5–3	Buffalo		Merzlikins	13,661	20–35–6	46

March: 3–8–2 (home: 1–2–0; road: 2–6–2)
#	Date	Visitor	Score	Home	OT	Decision	Attendance	Record	Pts	Recap
62	March 3	Seattle	4–2	Columbus		Merzlikins	18,712	20–36–6	46
63	March 4	Columbus	2–5	Ottawa		Merzlikins	18,073	20–37–6	46
64	March 7	Columbus	4–5	Pittsburgh	OT	Hutchinson	17,400	20–37–7	47
65	March 11	St. Louis	5–2	Columbus		Hutchinson	18,222	20–38–7	47
66	March 14	Columbus	6–5	San Jose	OT	Tarasov	10,127	21–38–7	49
67	March 16	Columbus	1–4	Los Angeles		Tarasov	15,460	21–39–7	49
68	March 17	Columbus	4–7	Anaheim		Hutchinson	13,475	21–40–7	49
69	March 19	Columbus	2–7	Vegas		Tarasov	18,004	21–41–7	49
70	March 21	Columbus	7–6	Washington	OT	Tarasov	18,573	22–41–7	51
71	March 24	NY Islanders	4–5	Columbus	OT	Hutchinson	18,940	23–41–7	53
72	March 25	Columbus	2–8	Montreal		Merzlikins	21,105	23–42–7	53
73	March 28	Columbus	2–6	NY Rangers		Hutchinson	18,006	23–43–7	53
74	March 30	Columbus	1–2	Boston	OT	Hutchinson	17,850	23–43–8	54

April: 2–5–1 (home: 2–3–0; road: 0–2–1)
#	Date	Visitor	Score	Home	OT	Decision	Attendance	Record	Pts	Recap
75	April 1	Florida	7–0	Columbus		Hutchinson	17,860	23–44–8	54
76	April 2	Ottawa	3–4	Columbus	OT	Gillies	18,872	24–44–8	56
77	April 4	Columbus	2–4	Toronto		Greaves	18,597	24–45–8	56
78	April 6	Columbus	1–8	New Jersey		Hutchinson	16,514	24–46–8	56
79	April 8	NY Rangers	4–0	Columbus		Hutchinson	18,824	24–47–8	56
80	April 11	Columbus	3–4	Philadelphia	OT	Hutchinson	19,719	24–47–9	57
81	April 13	Pittsburgh	2–3	Columbus	OT	Hutchinson	18,369	25–47–9	59
82	April 14	Buffalo	5–2	Columbus		Gillies	18,786	25–48–9	59

Legend: Win (2 points) Loss (0 points) Overtime/shootout loss (1 point)
Notes:
^{a} Game was played at Nokia Arena in Tampere, Finland.

== Player statistics ==
=== Skaters ===
Regular season
Player	GP	G	A	Pts	+/−	PIM
Johnny Gaudreau	80	21	53	74	–33	22
Patrik Laine	55	22	30	52	–12	16
Boone Jenner	68	26	19	45	–32	51
Jack Roslovic	77	11	33	44	–14	10
Kent Johnson	79	16	24	40	–19	14
Kirill Marchenko	59	21	4	25	–23	16
Eric Robinson	72	12	12	24	–21	6
Adam Boqvist	46	5	19	24	–12	8
Gustav Nyquist^{‡}	48	10	12	22	–11	16
Emil Bemstrom	55	7	15	22	–11	6
Sean Kuraly	71	11	9	20	–28	68
Mathieu Olivier	66	5	10	15	–20	81
Liam Foudy	62	7	7	14	–26	8
Nick Blankenburg	36	4	10	14	–16	16
Gavin Bayreuther	51	2	12	14	–18	23
Andrew Peeke	80	6	7	13	–41	22
Yegor Chinakhov	30	4	9	13	–6	10
Erik Gudbranson	70	1	12	13	–24	57
Cole Sillinger	64	3	8	11	–23	22
Marcus Bjork	33	3	8	11	–9	42
Vladislav Gavrikov^{‡}	52	3	7	10	–8	30
Zach Werenski	13	3	5	8	–6	0
Jakub Voracek^{‡}	11	1	5	6	–7	0
Jake Bean	14	1	5	6	–2	6
Jake Christiansen	24	0	4	4	–7	4
Lane Pederson^{†}	16	2	1	3	–4	11
Justin Danforth	6	2	1	3	–3	4
Tim Berni	59	1	2	3	–26	34
Hunter McKown	12	0	2	2	–4	8
Trey Fix-Wolansky	9	1	0	1	–5	0
Joona Luoto	7	1	0	1	–7	0
Tyler Angle	2	1	0	1	–2	0
Brendan Gaunce	5	0	1	1	–1	2
Carson Meyer	14	0	1	1	–2	6
Justin Richards	2	0	1	1	–1	0
Billy Sweezey	9	0	1	1	–3	9
Mikael Pyyhtia	2	0	1	1	–2	2
Stanislav Svozil	2	0	1	1	–3	2
Samuel Knazko	2	0	0	0	0	0
Josh Dunne	8	0	0	0	–6	6
David Jiricek	4	0	0	0	–4	2

=== Goaltenders ===
Regular season
Player	GP	GS	TOI	W	L	OT	GA	GAA	SA	SV%	SO	G	A	PIM
Joonas Korpisalo^{‡}	28	26	1,550:57	11	11	3	82	3,17	926	.913	0	0	0	0
Elvis Merzlikins	30	27	1,560:12	7	18	2	110	4,23	889	.876	0	0	1	4
Daniil Tarasov	17	16	874:08	4	11	1	57	3,91	528	.892	0	0	1	0
Michael Hutchinson^{†}	16	10	755:27	2	6	3	54	4,29	432	.877	0	0	1	0
Jon Gillies^{†}	3	2	118:09	1	1	0	9	4,57	66	.864	0	0	0	0
Jet Greaves	1	1	58:57	0	1	0	3	3,05	49	.939	0	0	0	0

^{†}Denotes player spent time with another team before joining the Blue Jackets. Stats reflect time with the Blue Jackets only.
^{‡}Denotes player was traded mid-season. Stats reflect time with the Blue Jackets only.
Bold/italics denotes franchise record.

== Transactions ==
The Blue Jackets have been involved in the following transactions during the 2022–23 season.

Key:

† Contract is entry-level.
‡ Contract initially takes effect in the 2023-24 season.

=== Trades ===
Date	Details		Ref
July 8, 2022	To San Jose Sharks 5th-round pick in 2023	To Columbus Blue Jackets BUF 5th-round pick in 2022	
July 22, 2022	To Seattle Kraken Oliver Bjorkstrand	To Columbus Blue Jackets 3rd-round pick in 2023; WPG 4th-round pick in 2023	
February 28, 2023	To Minnesota Wild Gustav Nyquist^{1}	To Columbus Blue Jackets 5th-round pick in 2023	
March 1, 2023	To Los Angeles Kings Vladislav Gavrikov; Joonas Korpisalo	To Columbus Blue Jackets Jonathan Quick; Conditional^{2} 1st-round pick in 2023; 3rd-round pick in 2024	
March 2, 2023	To Vegas Golden Knights Jonathan Quick^{3}	To Columbus Blue Jackets Michael Hutchinson; 7th-round pick in 2025	
March 2, 2023	To Arizona Coyotes Jakub Voracek; 6th-round pick in 2023	To Columbus Blue Jackets Jon Gillies	
June 6, 2023	To Philadelphia Flyers Helge Grans; Cal Petersen; Sean Walker; LAK 1st-round pick in 2023; LAK 2nd-round pick in 2024; Conditional CBJ 2nd-round pick in 2024 or 2025	To Columbus Blue Jackets Ivan Provorov^{4}	
June 6, 2023	To Los Angeles Kings Kevin Connauton; Hayden Hodgson	To Columbus Blue Jackets Ivan Provorov^{4}	
June 9, 2023	To New Jersey Devils 3rd-round pick in 2023	To Columbus Blue Jackets Damon Severson	

Notes:

1. Columbus retains 50% of Nyquist's contract.
2. If Los Angeles fails to make the 2023 Stanley Cup playoffs, Columbus will instead their 2nd-round pick in 2023 and 2nd-rouind pick in 2024.
3. Columbus retains 50% of Quick's contract.
4. Los Angeles retains 30% of Provorov's contract.

=== Players acquired ===
Date	Player	Former team	Term	Via	Ref
July 13, 2022	Johnny Gaudreau	Calgary Flames	7-year	Free agency	
July 13, 2022	Erik Gudbranson	Calgary Flames	4-year	Free agency	
October 2, 2022	Nolan Lalonde	Erie Otters (OHL)	3-year†	Free agency	
December 19, 2022	Justin Richards	Cleveland Monsters (AHL)	1-year	Free agency	
January 28, 2023	Lane Pederson	Vancouver Canucks		Waivers	
March 16, 2022	Cameron Butler	Oshawa Generals (OHL)	3-year†‡	Free agency	
March 20, 2022	Hunter McKown	Colorado College Tigers (NCHC)	3-year†	Free agency	

=== Players lost ===
Date	Player	New team	Term	Via	Ref
July 13, 2022	Kevin Stenlund	Winnipeg Jets	1-year	Free agency	
July 20, 2022	Gabriel Carlsson	Washington Capitals	1-year	Free agency	
July 20, 2022	Cam Johnson	Charlotte Checkers (AHL)	1-year	Free agency	
September 14, 2022	Nathan Gerbe			Retirement	
September 30, 2022	Scott Harrington	San Jose Sharks	1-year	Free agency	
October 3, 2022	Tyler Sikura	Wilkes-Barre/Scranton Penguins (AHL)	1-year	Free agency	

=== Signings ===
Date	Player	Term	Ref
July 13, 2022	David Jiricek	3-year†	
July 13, 2022	Denton Mateychuk	3-year†	
July 15, 2022	Nick Blankenburg	2-year	
July 22, 2022	Patrik Laine	4-year	
July 23, 2022	Trey Fix-Wolansky	1-year	
August 3, 2022	Emil Bemstrom	2-year	
September 28, 2022	Andrew Peeke	3-year‡	
November 25, 2022	Jordan Dumais	3-year†	
December 1, 2022	Luca Del Bel Belluz	3-year†	
December 1, 2022	James Malatesta	3-year†	
March 1, 2023	Corson Ceulemans	3-year†‡	
April 4, 2023	Yegor Chinakhov	1-year‡	
May 4, 2023	Dmitri Voronkov	2-year†‡	
June 5, 2023	Jake Christiansen	1-year‡	
June 14, 2023	Josh Dunne	1-year‡	
June 21, 2023	Mathieu Olivier	2-year‡	
June 23, 2023	Carson Meyer	1-year‡	
June 27, 2023	Trey Fix-Wolansky	2-year‡	

== Draft picks ==
Below are the Columbus Blue Jackets' selections at the 2022 NHL entry draft, which was held on July 7 to 8, 2022, at Bell Centre in Montreal.

Round	#	Player	Pos.	Nationality	Team (League)
1	6^{1}	David Jiricek	D	Czech Republic	HC Škoda Plzeň (ELH)
1	12	Denton Mateychuk	D	Canada	Moose Jaw Warriors (WHL)
2	44	Luca Del Bel Belluz	C	Canada	Mississauga Steelheads (OHL)
3	96^{3}	Jordan Dumais	RW	Canada	Halifax Mooseheads (QMJHL)
4	109	Kirill Dolzhenkov	RW	Russia	Krasnaya Armiya (MHL)
5	138^{4}	Sergei Ivanov	G	Russia	SKA-1946 (MHL)
7	203^{7}	James Fisher	RW	USA	Belmont High School (USHS-Prep)

Notes:

1. The Chicago Blackhawks' first-round pick went to the Columbus Blue Jackets as the result of a trade on July 23, 2021, that sent Seth Jones, Tampa Bay's first-round pick in 2021 and a sixth-round pick in 2022 to Chicago in exchange for Adam Boqvist, a first and second-round pick both in 2021 and this pick (being conditional at the time of the trade). The condition – Columbus will receive a first-round pick in 2022 if Chicago does not win either of the two draws in the 2022 Draft Lottery – was converted when the Blackhawks did not win either draw in the 2022 draft lottery on May 10, 2022.
2. The Columbus Blue Jackets' third-round pick went to the Winnipeg Jets as the result of a trade on January 23, 2021, that sent Patrik Laine and Jack Roslovic to Columbus in exchange for Pierre-Luc Dubois and this pick.
3. The Tampa Bay Lightning's third-round pick went to the Columbus Blue Jackets as the result of a trade on April 10, 2021, that sent Brian Lashoff to Tampa Bay in exchange for a first-round pick in 2021 and this pick.
4. The Buffalo Sabres' fifth-round pick went to the Columbus Blue Jackets as the result of a trade on July 8, 2022, that sent a fifth-round pick in 2023 to San Jose in exchange for this pick.
5. The Columbus Blue Jackets' fifth-round pick went to the New Jersey Devils as the result of a trade on February 25, 2019, that sent Keith Kinkaid to Columbus in exchange for this pick.
6. The Columbus Blue Jackets' sixth-round pick went to the Chicago Blackhawks as the result of a trade on July 23, 2021, that sent Adam Boqvist, a first and second-round pick both in 2021 (12th and 44th overall) and a conditional first-round pick in 2022 to Columbus in exchange for Seth Jones, Tampa Bay's first-round pick in 2021 and this pick.
7. The Anaheim Ducks' seventh-round pick went to the Columbus Blue Jackets as the result of a trade on October 7, 2020, that sent a seventh-round pick in 2020 to Anaheim in exchange for this pick (being conditional at the time of the trade). The condition – Columbus will receive a seventh-round pick in 2022 if the pick is available at the time of the selection – was converted when the pick became available after an earlier conditional trade with Edmonton was resolved on April 8, 2021.
8. The Columbus Blue Jackets' seventh-round pick went to the Carolina Hurricanes as the result of a trade on February 13, 2021, that sent Gregory Hofmann to Columbus in exchange for this pick.
