= 2022–23 Arizona Coyotes season =

National Hockey League season

2022–23 Arizona Coyotes
- Division: 7th Central
- Conference: 13th Western
- 2022–23 record: 28–40–14
- Home record: 21–15–5
- Road record: 7–25–9
- Goals for: 228
- Goals against: 299

Team information
- General manager: Bill Armstrong
- Coach: Andre Tourigny
- Captain: Vacant
- Alternate captains: Lawson Crouse; Christian Fischer; Clayton Keller
- Arena: Mullett Arena
- Average attendance: 4,600
- Minor league affiliates: Tucson Roadrunners (AHL); Atlanta Gladiators (ECHL)

Team leaders
- Goals: Clayton Keller (37)
- Assists: Clayton Keller (49)
- Points: Clayton Keller (86)
- Penalty minutes: Liam O'Brien (114)
- Plus/minus: Jakob Chychrun (+8)
- Wins: Karel Vejmelka (18)
- Goals against average: Connor Ingram (3.37)

The 2022–23 Arizona Coyotes season was the 44th season for the National Hockey League (NHL) franchise that was established on June 22, 1979, the 27th season since the franchise relocated from Winnipeg following the 1995–96 NHL season, and the 51st overall season, including the World Hockey Association years. It was their first season playing their home games at Mullett Arena, which held the distinction of being the smallest venue in the National Hockey League in the modern 21st century based on seating capacity, accommodating just 4,600 spectators at maximum capacity. This was also the last season where Coyotes games aired on Bally Sports Arizona after previously partnering with the network since the franchise's move to Phoenix, Arizona in 1996; following this season, the Coyotes moved their airing rights to Scripps Sports to air games both in Arizona and Utah, while Bally Sports ultimately shut down for good on October 21, 2023, after losing airing rights to the Coyotes months after already failing to secure airing rights to the Phoenix Suns and Arizona Diamondbacks earlier in the year. The Coyotes were eliminated from playoff contention on March 24, 2023, after a loss to the Colorado Avalanche.

== Standings ==
=== Divisional standings ===
Central Division
Pos	Team	GP	W	L	OTL	RW	GF	GA	GD	Pts
1	y – Colorado Avalanche	82	51	24	7	36	280	226	+54	109
2	x – Dallas Stars	82	47	21	14	39	285	218	+67	108
3	x – Minnesota Wild	82	46	25	11	34	246	225	+21	103
4	x – Winnipeg Jets	82	46	33	3	36	247	225	+22	95
5	Nashville Predators	82	42	32	8	29	229	238	−9	92
6	St. Louis Blues	82	37	38	7	27	263	301	−38	81
7	Arizona Coyotes	82	28	40	14	20	228	299	−71	70
8	Chicago Blackhawks	82	26	49	7	18	204	301	−97	59

Source: National Hockey League
Rules for classification: 1) Fewer number of games played (GP, only during regular season); 2) Greater number of regulation wins (RW); 3) Greater number of wins in regulation and overtime, excluding shootout wins (ROW); 4) Greater number of total wins, including shootouts (W); 5) Greater number of points earned in head-to-head play; if teams played an uneven number of head-to-head games, the result of the first game on the home ice of the team with the extra home game is discarded; 6) Greater goal differential (GD); 7) Greater number of goals scored (GF)
x – Clinched playoff spot; y – Clinched division

=== Conference standings ===
Western Conference Wild Card
Pos	Div	Team	GP	W	L	OTL	RW	GF	GA	GD	Pts
1	PA	x – Seattle Kraken	82	46	28	8	37	289	256	+33	100
2	CE	x – Winnipeg Jets	82	46	33	3	36	247	225	+22	95
3	PA	Calgary Flames	82	38	27	17	31	260	252	+8	93
4	CE	Nashville Predators	82	42	32	8	29	229	238	−9	92
5	PA	Vancouver Canucks	82	38	37	7	24	276	298	−22	83
6	CE	St. Louis Blues	82	37	38	7	27	263	301	−38	81
7	CE	Arizona Coyotes	82	28	40	14	20	228	299	−71	70
8	PA	San Jose Sharks	82	22	44	16	16	234	321	−87	60
9	CE	Chicago Blackhawks	82	26	49	7	18	204	301	−97	59
10	PA	Anaheim Ducks	82	23	47	12	13	209	338	−129	58

Source: National Hockey League
Rules for classification: 1) Fewer number of games played (GP, only during regular season); 2) Greater number of regulation wins (RW); 3) Greater number of wins in regulation and overtime, excluding shootout wins (ROW); 4) Greater number of total wins, including shootouts (W); 5) Greater number of points earned in head-to-head play; if teams played an uneven number of head-to-head games, the result of the first game on the home ice of the team with the extra home game is discarded; 6) Greater goal differential (GD); 7) Greater number of goals scored (GF)
x – Clinched playoff spot

== Schedule and results ==
=== Preseason ===
The team's preseason schedule was released on June 30, 2022.

2022 preseason game log: 0–6–1 (home: 0–2–0; road: 0–4–1)
#	Date	Visitor	Score	Home	OT	Decision	Attendance	Record	Recap
1	September 24^{[a]}	St. Louis	5–4	Arizona		Prosvetov	8,475	0–1–0
2	September 25^{[b]}	Anaheim	3–2	Arizona		Thornton	4,780	0–2–0
3	September 27^{[c]}	Arizona	3–4	Dallas	OT	Gillies	17,096	0–2–1
4	September 28	Arizona	1–3	Anaheim		Tendeck	17,174	0–3–1
5	October 4	Arizona	3–4	Vegas		Johansson	17,127	0–4–1
6	October 7	Arizona	0–4	Vancouver		Gillies	18,910	0–5–1
7	October 8^{[d]}	Arizona	1–5	Vegas		Vejmelka	5,240	0–6–1
Notes:^{a} Game will be played at Intrust Bank Arena in Wichita, Kansas.^{b} Game will be played at the Tucson Convention Center in Tucson, Arizona.^{c} Game will be played at BOK Center in Tulsa, Oklahoma.^{d} Game will be played at Idaho Central Arena in Boise, Idaho.

=== Regular season ===
The regular season schedule was released on July 6, 2022.

2022–23 game log

October: 2–5–1 (home: 0–1–1; road: 2–4–0)
#	Date	Visitor	Score	Home	OT	Decision	Attendance	Record	Pts	Recap
1	October 13	Arizona	2–6	Pittsburgh		Vejmelka	18,187	0–1–0	0
2	October 15	Arizona	3–6	Boston		Vejmelka	17,850	0–2–0	0
3	October 17	Arizona	4–2	Toronto		Vejmelka	18,819	1–2–0	2
4	October 20	Arizona	2–6	Montreal		Ingram	20,691	1–3–0	2
5	October 22	Arizona	2–6	Ottawa		Vejmelka	15,107	1–4–0	2
6	October 25	Arizona	6–3	Columbus		Ingram	18,144	2–4–0	4
7	October 28	Winnipeg	3–2	Arizona	OT	Vejmelka	4,600	2–4–1	5
8	October 30	NY Rangers	3–2	Arizona		Ingram	4,600	2–5–1	5

November: 5–5–2 (home: 1–1–0; road: 4–4–2)
#	Date	Visitor	Score	Home	OT	Decision	Attendance	Record	Pts	Recap
9	November 1	Florida	1–3	Arizona		Vejmelka	4,600	3–5–1	7
10	November 3	Dallas	7–2	Arizona		Ingram	4,600	3–6–1	7
11	November 5	Arizona	3–2	Washington		Vejmelka	18,573	4–6–1	9
12	November 8	Arizona	4–1	Buffalo		Vejmelka	10,296	5–6–1	11
13	November 10	Arizona	2–0	NY Islanders		Vejmelka	17,255	6–6–1	13
14	November 12	Arizona	2–4	New Jersey		Vejmelka	16,514	6–7–1	13
15	November 13	Arizona	1–4	NY Rangers		Ingram	18,006	6–8–1	13
16	November 17	Arizona	1–4	Vegas		Vejmelka	17,708	6–9–1	13
17	November 21	Arizona	3–4	Nashville	SO	Ingram	17,159	6–9–2	14
18	November 23	Arizona	4–0	Carolina		Vejmelka	18,775	7–9–2	16
19	November 25	Arizona	3–4	Detroit	SO	Vejmelka	19,515	7–9–3	17
20	November 27	Arizona	3–4	Minnesota		Ingram	17,745	7–10–3	17

December: 6–7–2 (home: 6–2–1; road: 0–5–1)
#	Date	Visitor	Score	Home	OT	Decision	Attendance	Record	Pts	Recap
21	December 1	Arizona	3–5	Los Angeles		Vejmelka	13,764	7–11–3	17
22	December 3	Arizona	2–3	Vancouver	OT	Vejmelka	18,516	7–11–4	18
23	December 5	Arizona	2–3	Calgary		Vejmelka	16,899	7–12–4	18
24	December 7	Arizona	2–8	Edmonton		Ingram	16,633	7–13–4	18
25	December 9	Boston	3–4	Arizona		Vejmelka	4,600	8–13–4	20
26	December 11	Philadelphia	4–5	Arizona	OT	Vejmelka	4,600	9–13–4	22
27	December 13	Arizona	2–3	San Jose		Vejmelka	10,462	9–14–4	22
28	December 16	NY Islanders	4–5	Arizona		Vejmelka	4,600	10–14–4	24
29	December 17	Buffalo	5–2	Arizona		Ingram	4,600	10–15–4	24
30	December 19	Montreal	3–2	Arizona	OT	Vejmelka	4,600	10–15–5	25
31	December 21	Arizona	2–5	Vegas		Vejmelka	17,711	10–16–5	25
32	December 23	Los Angeles	1–2	Arizona	SO	Vejmelka	4,600	11–16–5	27
33	December 27	Colorado	3–6	Arizona		Ingram	4,600	12–16–5	29
34	December 29	Toronto	3–5	Arizona		Vejmelka	4,600	13–16–5	31
35	December 31	Arizona	3–5	Tampa Bay		Vejmelka	19,092	13–17–5	31

January: 3–11–1 (home: 3–5–0; road: 0–6–1)
#	Date	Visitor	Score	Home	OT	Decision	Attendance	Record	Pts	Recap
36	January 3	Arizona	3–5	Florida		Vejmelka	19,484	13–18–5	31
37	January 5	Arizona	2–6	Philadelphia		Vejmelka	17,572	13–19–5	31
38	January 6	Arizona	0–2	Chicago		Ingram	19,359	13–20–5	31
39	January 8	Pittsburgh	4–1	Arizona		Vejmelka	4,600	13–21–5	31
40	January 10	San Jose	4–2	Arizona		Vejmelka	4,600	13–22–5	31
41	January 12	Ottawa	5–3	Arizona		Vejmelka	4,600	13–23–5	31
42	January 14	Arizona	1–2	Minnesota		Ingram	19,299	13–24–5	31
43	January 15	Arizona	1–2	Winnipeg		Vejmelka	13,949	13–25–5	31
44	January 17	Detroit	3–4	Arizona	SO	Ingram	4,600	14–25–5	33
45	January 19	Washington	4–0	Arizona		Vejmelka	4,600	14–26–5	33
46	January 21	Arizona	0–4	Dallas		Ingram	18,532	14–27–5	33
47	January 22	Vegas	1–4	Arizona		Vejmelka	4,600	15–27–5	35
48	January 24	Anaheim	5–2	Arizona		Ingram	4,600	15–28–5	35
49	January 26	St. Louis	0–5	Arizona		Vejmelka	4,600	16–28–5	37
50	January 28	Arizona	1–2	Anaheim	OT	Ingram	16,126	16–28–6	38

February: 5–2–3 (home: 4–2–0; road: 1–0–3)
#	Date	Visitor	Score	Home	OT	Decision	Attendance	Record	Pts	Recap
51	February 6	Minnesota	2–3	Arizona		Vejmelka	4,600	17–28–6	40
52	February 10	Arizona	3–4	Chicago	OT	Ingram	19,007	17–28–7	41
53	February 11	Arizona	5–6	St. Louis	OT	Vejmelka	18,096	17–28–8	42
54	February 13	Arizona	4–2	Nashville		Vejmelka	17,159	18–28–8	44
55	February 15	Tampa Bay	0–1	Arizona	SO	Ingram	4,600	19–28–8	46
56	February 18	Arizona	5–6	Los Angeles	SO	Ingram	18,230	19–28–9	47
57	February 19	Columbus	2–3	Arizona	OT	Ingram	4,600	20–28–9	49
58	February 22	Calgary	6–3	Arizona		Vejmelka	4,600	20–29–9	49
59	February 26	Nashville	6–2	Arizona		Ingram	4,600	20–30–9	49
60	February 28	Chicago	1–4	Arizona		Vejmelka	4,600	21–30–9	51

March: 6–6–4 (home: 6–3–2; road: 0–3–2)
#	Date	Visitor	Score	Home	OT	Decision	Attendance	Record	Pts	Recap
61	March 1	Arizona	2–4	Dallas		Ingram	18,045	21–31–9	51
62	March 3	Carolina	6–1	Arizona		Vejmelka	4,600	21–32–9	51
63	March 5	New Jersey	5–4	Arizona	OT	Ingram	4,600	21–32–10	52
64	March 7	St. Louis	2–6	Arizona		Vejmelka	4,600	22–32–10	54
65	March 9	Nashville	1–4	Arizona		Prosvetov	4,600	23–32–10	56
66	March 11	Arizona	2–3	Colorado	OT	Ingram	18,124	23–32–11	57
67	March 12	Minnesota	4–5	Arizona	OT	Vejmelka	4,600	24–32–11	59
68	March 14	Calgary	3–4	Arizona	OT	Ingram	4,600	25–32–11	61
69	March 16	Vancouver	2–3	Arizona		Prosvetov	4,600	26–32–11	63
70	March 18	Chicago	2–4	Arizona		Prosvetov	4,600	27–32–11	65
71	March 21	Arizona	1–2	Winnipeg		Vejmelka	13,216	27–33–11	65
72	March 22	Arizona	3–4	Edmonton	OT	Ingram	18,225	27–33–12	66
73	March 24	Arizona	1–3	Colorado		Vejmelka	18,136	27–34–12	66
74	March 26	Colorado	4–3	Arizona	SO	Ingram	4,600	27–34–13	67
75	March 27	Edmonton	5–4	Arizona		Vejmelka	4,600	27–35–13	67
76	March 31	Dallas	5–2	Arizona		Vejmelka	4,600	27–36–13	67

April: 1–4–1 (home: 1–2–1; road: 0–2–0)
#	Date	Visitor	Score	Home	OT	Decision	Attendance	Record	Pts	Recap
77	April 1	San Jose	7–2	Arizona		Prosvetov	4,600	27–37–13	67
78	April 3	Arizona	1–8	Seattle		Prosvetov	17,151	27–38–13	67
79	April 6	Arizona	2–4	Seattle		Vejmelka	17,151	27–39–13	67
80	April 8	Anaheim	4–5	Arizona	OT	Prosvetov	4,600	28–39–13	69
81	April 10	Seattle	4–1	Arizona		Prosvetov	4,600	28–40–13	69
82	April 13	Vancouver	5–4	Arizona	OT	Vejmelka	4,600	28–40–14	70

Legend: Win (2 points) Loss (0 points) Overtime/shootout loss (1 point)

== Player statistics ==
=== Skaters ===
Regular season
Player	GP	G	A	Pts	+/−	PIM
Clayton Keller	82	37	49	86	−2	49
Nick Schmaltz	63	22	36	58	+4	20
Matias Maccelli	64	11	38	49	0	18
Lawson Crouse	77	24	21	45	−3	35
Barrett Hayton	82	19	24	43	−5	42
Travis Boyd	82	15	19	34	−32	26
Juuso Valimaki	78	4	30	34	−10	59
Shayne Gostisbehere^{‡}	52	10	21	31	−6	28
J.J. Moser	82	7	24	31	−12	35
Jakob Chychrun^{‡}	36	7	21	28	+8	22
Christian Fischer	80	13	14	27	−7	20
Jack McBain	82	12	14	26	−8	64
Nick Bjugstad^{‡}	59	13	10	23	+7	26
Nick Ritchie^{‡}	58	9	12	21	−15	43
Dylan Guenther	33	6	9	15	−7	10
Liam O'Brien	56	3	8	11	−5	114
Victor Soderstrom	30	0	9	9	−3	24
Josh Brown	68	4	3	7	−18	87
Troy Stecher^{‡}	61	0	7	7	−3	29
Brett Ritchie^{†}	16	2	3	5	−2	2
Patrik Nemeth	75	0	5	5	−7	30
Connor Mackey^{†}	20	1	3	4	+2	39
Michael Carcone	9	2	1	3	+3	2
Michael Kesselring	9	0	3	3	−1	6
Zack Kassian	51	2	0	2	−18	50
Milos Kelemen	14	1	0	1	−5	23
Laurent Dauphin	21	1	0	1	−4	10
Jan Jenik	2	0	0	0	0	4
Vladislav Kolyachonok	2	0	0	0	0	0
Conor Timmins^{‡}	2	0	0	0	−2	0
Bokondji Imama	5	0	0	0	−2	5
Jean-Sebastien Dea	4	0	0	0	−2	0
Dysin Mayo^{‡}	15	0	0	0	−8	8
Nathan Smith	4	0	0	0	−1	4

=== Goaltenders ===
Regular season
Player	GP	GS	TOI	W	L	OT	GA	GAA	SA	SV%	SO	G	A	PIM
Karel Vejmelka	50	49	2,940:50	18	24	6	168	3.43	1,670	.900	3	0	0	2
Connor Ingram	27	26	1,586:40	6	13	8	89	3.37	960	.907	1	0	0	2
Ivan Prosvetov	7	7	422:02	4	3	0	28	3.98	234	.880	0	0	0	0

^{†}Denotes player spent time with another team before joining the Coyotes. Stats reflect time with the Coyotes only.
^{‡}Denotes player was traded mid-season. Stats reflect time with the Coyotes only.
Bold/italics denotes franchise record.

== Transactions ==
The Coyotes have been involved in the following transactions during the 2022–23 season.

Key:

† Contract is entry-level.
‡ Contract initially takes effect in the 2023–24 season.

=== Trades ===
Date	Details		Ref
July 7, 2022	To Edmonton Oilers COL 1st-round pick in 2022	To Arizona Coyotes Zack Kassian; 1st-round pick in 2022; 2nd-round pick in 2025; 3rd-round pick in 2024	
July 7, 2022	To San Jose Sharks CAR 1st-round pick in 2022; 2nd-round pick in 2022; NYI 2nd-round pick in 2022	To Arizona Coyotes 1st-round pick in 2022	
July 8, 2022	To Chicago Blackhawks DAL 3rd-round pick in 2023	To Arizona Coyotes EDM 3rd-round pick in 2022	
July 8, 2022	To San Jose Sharks VAN 7th-round pick in 2023	To Arizona Coyotes 7th-round pick in 2022	
July 8, 2022	To New York Rangers Ty Emberson	To Arizona Coyotes Patrik Nemeth; 2nd-round pick in 2025; Conditional^{1} 3rd-round pick in 2024	
November 23, 2022	To Toronto Maple Leafs Conor Timmins	To Arizona Coyotes Curtis Douglas	
February 22, 2023	To Vegas Golden Knights Dysin Mayo	To Arizona Coyotes Shea Weber; 5th-round pick in 2023	
February 28, 2023	To Chicago Blackhawks Vili Saarijarvi; Andy Welinski; Conditional 2nd-round pick in 2023; 4th-round pick in 2025	To Arizona Coyotes Conditional 3rd-round pick in 2025	
February 28, 2023	To New York Rangers Patrick Kane; Cooper Zech	To Arizona Coyotes Conditional 3rd-round pick in 2025	
March 1, 2023	To Carolina Hurricanes Shayne Gostisbehere	To Arizona Coyotes 3rd-round pick in 2026	
March 1, 2023	To Ottawa Senators Jakob Chychrun	To Arizona Coyotes 1st-round pick in 2023; WSH 2nd-round in 2024; 2nd-round pick in 2026	
March 2, 2023	To Columbus Blue Jackets Jon Gillies	To Arizona Coyotes Jakub Voracek; 6th-round pick in 2023	
March 2, 2023	To Edmonton Oilers Nick Bjugstad^{1} Cam Dineen	To Arizona Coyotes Michael Kesselring; 3rd-round pick in 2023	
March 3, 2023	To Calgary Flames Nick Ritchie; Troy Stecher	To Arizona Coyotes Connor Mackey; Brett Ritchie	
March 9, 2023	To Detroit Red Wings Future considerations	To Arizona Coyotes Steven Kampfer	
June 24, 2023	To Los Angeles Kings MTL 2nd-round pick in 2024	To Arizona Coyotes Sean Durzi	

Notes:

1. Arizona will either receive a 3rd-round pick in 2024 or a 2nd-round pick in 2026 at their own choosing.
2. Arizona retains 50% of Bjugstad's salary.

=== Players acquired ===
Date	Player	Former team	Term	Via	Ref
July 13, 2022	Nick Bjugstad	Minnesota Wild	1-year	Free agency	
July 13, 2022	Josh Brown	Boston Bruins	2-year	Free agency	
July 13, 2022	Laurent Dauphin	Montreal Canadiens	1-year	Free agency	
July 13, 2022	Jon Gillies	New Jersey Devils	1-year	Free agency	
July 13, 2022	Troy Stecher	Los Angeles Kings	1-year	Free agency	
July 14, 2022	Jean-Sebastien Dea	Montreal Canadiens	2-year	Free agency	
July 14, 2022	Lukas Klok	Neftekhimik Nizhnekamsk (KHL)	1-year†	Free agency	
September 30, 2022	Jonas Johansson	Colorado Avalanche		Waivers	
October 9, 2022	Juuso Valimaki	Calgary Flames		Waivers	
October 10, 2022	Connor Ingram	Nashville Predators		Waivers	
June 5, 2023	Patrik Koch	HC Vítkovice Ridera (ELH)	1-year	Free agency	

=== Players lost ===
Date	Player	New team	Term	Via	Ref
July 14, 2022	Kyle Capobianco	Winnipeg Jets	2-year	Free agency	
July 18, 2022	Harri Sateri	EHC Biel (NL)	1-year	Free agency	
July 25, 2022	Dmitrij Jaskin	SKA St. Petersburg (KHL)	1-year	Free agency	
August 1, 2022	Blake Speers	Västerås IK (HockeyAllsvenskan)	1-year	Free agency	
August 3, 2022	Cole Hults	HC Bozen–Bolzano (ICEHL)		Free agency	
August 24, 2022	Phil Kessel	Vegas Golden Knights	1-year	Free agency	
October 12, 2022	Anton Stralman	Boston Bruins	1-year	Free agency	
October 12, 2022	Jonas Johansson	Colorado Avalanche		Waivers	
October 29, 2022	Lukas Klok			Contract termination	
May 9, 2023	Ronald Knot	Bílí Tygři Liberec (ELH)	3-year‡	Free agency	
June 1, 2023	Laurent Dauphin	HC Ambrì-Piotta (NL)	1-year‡	Free agency	

=== Signings ===
Date	Player	Term	Ref
July 11, 2022	Cam Dineen	1-year	
July 11, 2022	Christian Fischer	1-year	
July 13, 2022	Bokondji Imama	1-year	
July 18, 2022	Conor Geekie	3-year†	
August 8, 2022	Lawson Crouse	5-year	
August 17, 2022	Maveric Lamoureux	3-year†	
September 20, 2022	Barrett Hayton	2-year	
January 24, 2023	Juuso Valimaki	1-year‡	
March 16, 2023	Josh Doan	3-year†‡	
May 1, 2023	Maksymilian Szuber	3-year†‡	
May 3, 2023	Aku Raty	2-year†‡	
June 20, 2023	Steven Kampfer	1-year‡	
June 21, 2023	Michael Carcone	2-year‡	
June 25, 2023	Connor Ingram	3-year‡	
June 27, 2023	Ryan McGregor	1-year‡	

== Draft picks ==
Below are the Arizona Coyotes selections at the 2022 NHL entry draft, which were held on July 7 to 8, 2022. It was held at the Bell Centre in Montreal, Quebec.

Round	#	Player	Pos	Nationality	College/Junior/Club team (League)
1	3	Logan Cooley	C	United States	U.S. NTDP (USHL)
1	11^{1}	Conor Geekie	C	Canada	Winnipeg Ice (WHL)
1	29^{2}	Maveric Lamoureux	D	Canada	Drummondville Voltigeurs (QMJHL)
2	36^{4}	Artem Duda	D	Russia	Krasnaya Armiya (MHL)
2	43^{5}	Julian Lutz	LW	Germany	EHC Red Bull München (DEL)
3	67	Miko Matikka	RW	Finland	Jokerit (U20 SM-sarja)
3	94^{6}	Jeremy Langlois	D	Canada	Cape Breton Eagles (QMJHL)
5	131	Matthew Morden	D	Canada	St. Andrew's College (CAHS)
6	163	Maksymilian Szuber	D	Germany	EHC Red Bull München (DEL)
7	204^{9}	Adam Zlnka	RW	Slovakia	Sioux Falls Stampede (USHL)

Notes:

1. The San Jose Sharks' first-round pick went to the Arizona Coyotes as the result of a trade on July 7, 2022, that sent Carolina's first-round-pick in 2022 (27th overall), a second-round pick in 2022 (34th overall) and the Islanders' second-round pick in 2022 (45th overall) to San Jose in exchange for this pick.
2. The Edmonton Oilers' first-round pick went to the Arizona Coyotes as the result of a trade on July 7, 2022, that sent Colorado's first-round pick in 2022 (32nd overall) to Edmonton in exchange for Zack Kassian, a third-round pick in 2024, a second-round pick in 2025 and this pick.
3. The Arizona Coyotes' second-round pick went to the San Jose Sharks as the result of a trade on July 7, 2022, that sent a first-round pick in 2022 (11th overall) to Arizona in exchange for Carolina's first-round pick in 2022 (27th overall), the Islanders' second-round pick in 2022 (45th overall) and this pick.
4. The Philadelphia Flyers' second-round pick went to the Arizona Coyotes as the result of a trade on July 22, 2021, that sent future considerations to Philadelphia in exchange for Shayne Gostisbehere, St. Louis' seventh-round pick in 2022 and this pick.
5. The San Jose Sharks' second-round pick went to the Arizona Coyotes as the result of a trade on July 17, 2021, that sent Adin Hill and a seventh-round pick in 2022 to San Jose in exchange for Josef Korenar and this pick.
6. The Edmonton Oilers' third-round pick went to the Arizona Coyotes as the result of a trade on July 8, 2022, that sent Dallas' third-round pick in 2023 to Chicago in exchange for this pick.
7. The Arizona Coyotes' fourth-round pick went to the Winnipeg Jets as the result of a trade on March 21, 2022, that sent Bryan Little and Nathan Smith to Arizona in exchange for this pick.
8. The Arizona Coyotes' seventh-round pick went to the San Jose Sharks as the result of a trade on July 17, 2021, that sent Josef Korenar and a second-round pick in 2022 to Arizona in exchange for Adin Hill and this pick.
9. The San Jose Sharks' seventh-round pick went to the Arizona Coyotes as the result of a trade on July 8, 2022, that sent Vancouver's seventh-round pick in 2023 to San Jose in exchange for this pick.
