= 2022–23 Florida Panthers season =

National Hockey League season

2022–23 Florida Panthers
- Eastern Conference champions
- Division: 4th Atlantic
- Conference: 8th Eastern
- 2022–23 record: 42–32–8
- Home record: 23–13–5
- Road record: 19–19–3
- Goals for: 290
- Goals against: 273

Team information
- General manager: Bill Zito
- Coach: Paul Maurice
- Captain: Aleksander Barkov
- Alternate captains: Aaron Ekblad; Patric Hornqvist; Matthew Tkachuk
- Arena: FLA Live Arena
- Average attendance: 16,682
- Minor league affiliates: Charlotte Checkers (AHL); Florida Everblades (ECHL)

Team leaders
- Goals: Carter Verhaeghe (42)
- Assists: Matthew Tkachuk (69)
- Points: Matthew Tkachuk (109)
- Penalty minutes: Matthew Tkachuk (123)
- Plus/minus: Matthew Tkachuk (+29)
- Wins: Sergei Bobrovsky (24)
- Goals against average: Alex Lyon (2.89)

The 2022–23 Florida Panthers season was the 29th season for the National Hockey League (NHL) franchise that was established in 1993. It is the Panthers' 24th season at FLA Live Arena. This is the Panthers' first season under new head coach Paul Maurice. The Panthers qualified for the playoffs after the Buffalo Sabres and Pittsburgh Penguins each lost their games on April 11, 2023.

After barely clinching a wild card spot in the playoffs, the Panthers were set to face the Presidents' Trophy-winning Boston Bruins, who had set the NHL record for most wins and points in a season. After being down 3–1 in the series, the Panthers came back and won the series in overtime in game 7 to pull off one of the biggest upsets in NHL history. The Panthers would then upset the Toronto Maple Leafs to advance to the Eastern Conference Finals for the first time in 27 years. Subsequently, the Panthers would sweep the Carolina Hurricanes to advance to the Stanley Cup Final for the first time since 1996. Making their first Stanley Cup Final appearance for the first time in 27 years, the Panthers were defeated by the Vegas Golden Knights in five games. Coupled with the Miami Heat's defeat one night earlier in the NBA Finals against the Denver Nuggets (which was also decided in five games), South Florida had two teams lose their respective sport's finals on consecutive days.

== Off-season ==
On June 22, 2022, Paul Maurice was named head coach following the departure of interim coach Andrew Brunette.

== Standings ==
=== Divisional standings ===
Atlantic Division
Pos	Team	GP	W	L	OTL	RW	GF	GA	GD	Pts
1	p – Boston Bruins	82	65	12	5	54	305	177	+128	135
2	x – Toronto Maple Leafs	82	50	21	11	42	279	222	+57	111
3	x – Tampa Bay Lightning	82	46	30	6	38	283	254	+29	98
4	x – Florida Panthers	82	42	32	8	36	290	273	+17	92
5	Buffalo Sabres	82	42	33	7	30	296	300	−4	91
6	Ottawa Senators	82	39	35	8	31	261	271	−10	86
7	Detroit Red Wings	82	35	37	10	28	240	279	−39	80
8	Montreal Canadiens	82	31	45	6	21	232	307	−75	68

Source: National Hockey League
Rules for classification: 1) Fewer number of games played (GP, only during regular season); 2) Greater number of regulation wins (RW); 3) Greater number of wins in regulation and overtime, excluding shootout wins (ROW); 4) Greater number of total wins, including shootouts (W); 5) Greater number of points earned in head-to-head play; if teams played an uneven number of head-to-head games, the result of the first game on the home ice of the team with the extra home game is discarded; 6) Greater goal differential (GD); 7) Greater number of goals scored (GF)
p – Clinched Presidents' Trophy; x – Clinched playoff spot

=== Conference standings ===
Eastern Conference Wild Card
Pos	Div	Team	GP	W	L	OTL	RW	GF	GA	GD	Pts
1	ME	x – New York Islanders	82	42	31	9	36	243	222	+21	93
2	AT	x – Florida Panthers	82	42	32	8	36	290	273	+17	92
3	ME	Pittsburgh Penguins	82	40	31	11	31	262	264	−2	91
4	AT	Buffalo Sabres	82	42	33	7	30	296	300	−4	91
5	AT	Ottawa Senators	82	39	35	8	31	261	271	−10	86
6	AT	Detroit Red Wings	82	35	37	10	28	240	279	−39	80
7	ME	Washington Capitals	82	35	37	10	27	255	265	−10	80
8	ME	Philadelphia Flyers	82	31	38	13	26	222	277	−55	75
9	AT	Montreal Canadiens	82	31	45	6	21	232	307	−75	68
10	ME	Columbus Blue Jackets	82	25	48	9	15	214	330	−116	59

Source: National Hockey League
Rules for classification: 1) Fewer number of games played (GP, only during regular season); 2) Greater number of regulation wins (RW); 3) Greater number of wins in regulation and overtime, excluding shootout wins (ROW); 4) Greater number of total wins, including shootouts (W); 5) Greater number of points earned in head-to-head play; if teams played an uneven number of head-to-head games, the result of the first game on the home ice of the team with the extra home game is discarded; 6) Greater goal differential (GD); 7) Greater number of goals scored (GF)
x – Clinched playoff spot

== Schedule and results ==
=== Preseason ===
The preseason schedule was published on June 30, 2022.

2022 preseason game log: 2–4–0 (home: 1–1–0; road: 1–3–0)
#	Date	Visitor	Score	Home	OT	Decision	Attendance	Record	Recap
1	September 26	Florida	4–3	Nashville	OT	Guzda	8,648	1–0–0
2	September 26	Florida	0–4	Nashville		Knight	13,574	1–1–0
3	September 29	Carolina	5–2	Florida		Bobrovsky	6,156	1–2–0
4	October 1	Florida	3–4	Carolina		Knight	14,843	1–3–0
5	October 6	Tampa Bay	2–3	Florida		Bobrovsky	11,350	2–3–0
6	October 8	Florida	2–5	Tampa Bay		Knight	19,092	2–4–0

=== Regular season ===
The regular season schedule was published on July 6, 2022.

2022–23 game log

October: 5–3–1 (Home: 3–0–1; Road: 2–3–0)
#	Date	Visitor	Score	Home	OT	Decision	Attendance	Record	Pts	Recap
1	October 13	Florida	3–1	NY Islanders		Bobrovsky	17,255	1–0–0	2
2	October 15	Florida	4–3	Buffalo		Knight	11,481	2–0–0	4
3	October 17	Florida	3–5	Boston		Bobrovsky	17,850	2–1–0	4
4	October 19	Philadelphia	3–4	Florida		Bobrovsky	17,421	3–1–0	6
5	October 21	Tampa Bay	3–2	Florida	OT	Bobrovsky	17,531	3–1–1	7
6	October 23	NY Islanders	2–3	Florida		Knight	16,342	4–1–1	9
7	October 25	Florida	2–4	Chicago		Bobrovsky	12,859	4–2–1	9
8	October 27	Florida	3–4	Philadelphia		Bobrovsky	14,871	4–3–1	9
9	October 29	Ottawa	3–5	Florida		Knight	15,577	5–3–1	11

November: 5–6–3 (Home: 3–2–2; Road: 2–4–1)
#	Date	Visitor	Score	Home	OT	Decision	Attendance	Record	Pts	Recap
10	November 1	Florida	1–3	Arizona		Knight	4,600	5–4–1	11
11	November 3	Florida	4–3	San Jose	SO	Bobrovsky	10,182	6–4–1	13
12	November 5	Florida	4–5	Los Angeles		Bobrovsky	16,161	6–5–1	13
13	November 6	Florida	5–3	Anaheim		Knight	15,174	7–5–1	15
14	November 9	Carolina	0–3	Florida		Knight	13,225	8–5–1	17
15	November 12	Edmonton	4–2	Florida		Knight	16,579	8–6–1	17
16	November 15	Washington	2–5	Florida		Bobrovsky	13,813	9–6–1	19
17	November 17	Dallas	6–4	Florida		Knight	14,428	9–7–1	19
18	November 19	Calgary	5–4	Florida	SO	Knight	15,842	9–7–2	20
19	November 20	Florida	3–5	Columbus		Bobrovsky	15,643	9–8–2	20
20	November 23	Boston	2–5	Florida		Knight	17,511	10–8–2	22
21	November 26	St. Louis	5–4	Florida	OT	Knight	15,649	10–8–3	23
22	November 28	Florida	3–4	Edmonton	OT	Knight	17,775	10–8–4	24
23	November 29	Florida	2–6	Calgary		Bobrovsky	17,806	10–9–4	24

December: 6–8–0 (Home: 3–3–0; Road: 3–5–0)
#	Date	Visitor	Score	Home	OT	Decision	Attendance	Record	Pts	Recap
24	December 1	Florida	5–1	Vancouver		Knight	18,052	11–9–4	26
25	December 3	Florida	5–1	Seattle		Knight	17,151	12–9–4	28
26	December 6	Florida	2–5	Winnipeg		Knight	13,426	12–10–4	28
27	December 8	Detroit	1–5	Florida		Bobrovsky	14,961	13–10–4	30
28	December 10	Florida	1–4	Tampa Bay		Bobrovsky	19,092	13–11–4	30
29	December 11	Seattle	5–2	Florida		Bobrovsky	15,625	13–12–4	30
30	December 13	Columbus	0–4	Florida		Bobrovsky	15,819	14–12–4	32
31	December 15	Pittsburgh	4–2	Florida		Bobrovsky	14,538	14–13–4	32
32	December 17	Florida	4–2	New Jersey		Bobrovsky	15,082	15–13–4	34
33	December 19	Florida	3–7	Boston		Knight	17,850	15–14–4	34
34	December 21	New Jersey	4–2	Florida		Bobrovsky	17,073	15–15–4	34
35	December 23	Florida	1–5	NY Islanders		Bobrovsky	17,255	15–16–4	34
36	December 29	Montreal	2–7	Florida		Bobrovsky	19,623	16–16–4	36
37	December 30	Florida	0–4	Carolina		Knight	18,767	16–17–4	36

January: 8–5–2 (Home: 4–2–0; Road: 4–3–2)
#	Date	Visitor	Score	Home	OT	Decision	Attendance	Record	Pts	Recap
38	January 1	NY Rangers	5–3	Florida		Bobrovsky	18,272	16–18–4	36
39	January 3	Arizona	3–5	Florida		Knight	19,484	17–18–4	38
40	January 6	Florida	3–2	Detroit		Bobrovsky	19,515	18–18–4	40
41	January 8	Florida	1–5	Dallas		Knight	18,532	18–19–4	40
42	January 10	Florida	5–4	Colorado		Bobrovsky	18,102	19–19–4	42
43	January 12	Florida	2–4	Vegas		Bobrovsky	17,735	19–20–4	42
44	January 14	Vancouver	3–4	Florida		Bobrovsky	17,584	20–20–4	44
45	January 16	Florida	4–1	Buffalo		Bobrovsky	15,251	21–20–4	46
46	January 17	Florida	4–5	Toronto	OT	Bobrovsky	18,573	21–20–5	47
47	January 19	Florida	6–2	Montreal		Lyon	21,105	22–20–5	49
48	January 21	Minnesota	3–5	Florida		Lyon	16,759	23–20–5	51
49	January 23	Florida	2–6	NY Rangers		Lyon	17,121	23–21–5	51
50	January 24	Florida	6–7	Pittsburgh	OT	Lyon	17,159	23–21–6	52
51	January 27	Los Angeles	4–3	Florida		Lyon	15,322	23–22–6	52
52	January 28	Boston	3–4	Florida	OT	Lyon	18,058	24–22–6	54

February: 6–4–0 (Home: 3–2–0; Road: 3–2–0)
#	Date	Visitor	Score	Home	OT	Decision	Attendance	Record	Pts	Recap
53	February 6	Tampa Bay	1–7	Florida		Bobrovsky	15,882	25–22–6	56
54	February 9	San Jose	1–4	Florida		Bobrovsky	15,183	26–22–6	58
55	February 11	Colorado	5–3	Florida		Bobrovsky	17,472	26–23–6	58
56	February 13	Florida	2–1	Minnesota	SO	Bobrovsky	17,453	27–23–6	60
57	February 14	Florida	2–6	St. Louis		Knight	18,096	27–24–6	60
58	February 16	Florida	6–3	Washington		Bobrovsky	18,573	28–24–6	62
59	February 18	Florida	3–7	Nashville		Bobrovsky	17,823	28–25–6	62
60	February 20	Anaheim	3–4	Florida	OT	Bobrovsky	16,525	29–25–6	64
61	February 24	Buffalo	3–1	Florida		Bobrovsky	18,075	29–26–6	64
62	February 28	Florida	4–1	Tampa Bay		Bobrovsky	19,092	30–26–6	66

March: 8–5–1 (Home: 5–3–1; Road: 3–2–0)
#	Date	Visitor	Score	Home	OT	Decision	Attendance	Record	Pts	Recap
63	March 2	Nashville	2–1	Florida		Bobrovsky	16,660	30–27–6	66
64	March 4	Pittsburgh	1–4	Florida		Bobrovsky	16,581	31–27–6	68
65	March 7	Vegas	1–2	Florida		Bobrovsky	15,100	32–27–6	70
66	March 10	Chicago	3–4	Florida	OT	Bobrovsky	17,468	33–27–6	72
67	March 11	Winnipeg	5–4	Florida	OT	Bobrovsky	16,340	33–27–7	73
68	March 16	Montreal	5–9	Florida		Bobrovsky	17,372	34–27–7	75
69	March 18	New Jersey	2–4	Florida		Bobrovsky	17,321	35–27–7	77
70	March 20	Florida	5–2	Detroit		Bobrovsky	15,198	36–27–7	79
71	March 21	Florida	3–6	Philadelphia		Lyon	16,479	36–28–7	79
72	March 23	Toronto	6–2	Florida		Bobrovsky	16,704	36–29–7	79
73	March 25	NY Rangers	4–3	Florida		Bobrovsky	18,635	36–30–7	79
74	March 27	Florida	2–5	Ottawa		Bobrovsky	16,047	36–31–7	79
75	March 29	Florida	3–2	Toronto	OT	Lyon	18,894	37–31–7	81
76	March 30	Florida	5–2	Montreal		Lyon	21,105	38–31–7	83

April: 4–1–1 (Home: 2–1–1; Road: 2–0–0)
#	Date	Visitor	Score	Home	OT	Decision	Attendance	Record	Pts	Recap
77	April 1	Florida	7–0	Columbus		Lyon	17,860	39–31–7	85
78	April 4	Buffalo	1–2	Florida		Lyon	17,255	40–31–7	87
79	April 6	Ottawa	2–7	Florida		Lyon	16,675	41–31–7	89
80	April 8	Florida	4–2	Washington		Lyon	18,573	42–31–7	91
81	April 10	Toronto	2–1	Florida	OT	Lyon	18,521	42–31–8	92
82	April 13	Carolina	6–4	Florida		Lyon	19,160	42–32–8	92

Legend: Win (2 points) Loss (0 points) Overtime/shootout loss (1 point)

=== Playoffs ===
2023 Stanley Cup Playoffs

Eastern Conference First Round vs. (A1) Boston Bruins: Florida won 4–3
#	Date	Visitor	Score	Home	OT	Decision	Attendance	Series	Recap
1	April 17	Florida	1–3	Boston		Lyon	17,850	0–1
2	April 19	Florida	6–3	Boston		Lyon	17,850	1–1
3	April 21	Boston	4–2	Florida		Lyon	19,910	1–2
4	April 23	Boston	6–2	Florida		Bobrovsky	19,771	1–3
5	April 26	Florida	4–3	Boston	OT	Bobrovsky	17,850	2–3
6	April 28	Boston	5–7	Florida		Bobrovsky	18,911	3–3
7	April 30	Florida	4–3	Boston	OT	Bobrovsky	17,850	4–3

Eastern Conference Second Round vs. (A2) Toronto Maple Leafs: Florida won 4–1
#	Date	Visitor	Score	Home	OT	Decision	Attendance	Series	Recap
1	May 2	Florida	4–2	Toronto		Bobrovsky	19,244	1–0
2	May 4	Florida	3–2	Toronto		Bobrovsky	19,387	2–0
3	May 7	Toronto	2–3	Florida	OT	Bobrovsky	19,911	3–0
4	May 10	Toronto	2–1	Florida		Bobrovsky	19,868	3–1
5	May 12	Florida	3–2	Toronto	OT	Bobrovsky	19,513	4–1

Eastern Conference Final vs. (M1) Carolina Hurricanes: Florida won 4–0
#	Date	Visitor	Score	Home	OT	Decision	Attendance	Series	Recap
1	May 18	Florida	3–2	Carolina	4OT	Bobrovsky	18,680	1–0
2	May 20	Florida	2–1	Carolina	OT	Bobrovsky	18,854	2–0
3	May 22	Carolina	0–1	Florida		Bobrovsky	19,873	3–0
4	May 24	Carolina	3–4	Florida		Bobrovsky	20,065	4–0

Stanley Cup Final vs. (P1) Vegas Golden Knights: Vegas won 4–1
#	Date	Visitor	Score	Home	OT	Decision	Attendance	Series	Recap
1	June 3	Florida	2–5	Vegas		Bobrovsky	18,432	0–1
2	June 5	Florida	2–7	Vegas		Bobrovsky	18,561	0–2
3	June 8	Vegas	2–3	Florida	OT	Bobrovsky	19,735	1–2
4	June 10	Vegas	3–2	Florida		Bobrovsky	19,986	1–3
5	June 13	Florida	3–9	Vegas		Bobrovsky	19,058	1–4

Legend: Win Loss

== Player statistics ==
=== Skaters ===
Regular season
Player	GP	G	A	Pts	+/−	PIM
Matthew Tkachuk	79	40	69	109	+29	123
Aleksander Barkov	68	23	55	78	+10	8
Carter Verhaeghe	81	42	31	73	+10	46
Brandon Montour	80	16	57	73	+9	107
Sam Reinhart	82	31	36	67	−12	12
Eetu Luostarinen	82	17	26	43	+19	28
Gustav Forsling	82	13	28	41	+19	40
Sam Bennett	63	16	24	40	+5	54
Aaron Ekblad	71	14	24	38	−14	68
Anton Lundell	73	12	21	33	+1	43
Eric Staal	72	14	15	29	−5	26
Nick Cousins	79	9	18	27	−1	38
Ryan Lomberg	82	12	8	20	−1	88
Radko Gudas	72	2	15	17	+14	79
Josh Mahura	82	4	12	16	+17	48
Colin White	68	8	7	15	0	12
Marc Staal	82	3	12	15	+10	43
Anthony Duclair	20	2	7	9	+4	2
Rudolfs Balcers	14	2	2	4	−2	4
Zac Dalpe	14	2	2	4	−4	2
Matt Kiersted	20	1	3	4	+4	6
Givani Smith^{†}	34	1	3	4	+1	72
Chris Tierney	13	2	1	3	−1	2
Aleksi Heponiemi	10	1	2	3	−1	2
Patric Hornqvist	22	1	2	3	−4	13
Grigori Denisenko	18	0	3	3	−5	4
Anton Levtchi	2	0	0	0	0	0
Casey Fitzgerald^{†}	4	0	0	0	−1	0
Lucas Carlsson	2	0	0	0	−1	2

Playoffs
Player	GP	G	A	Pts	+/−	PIM
Matthew Tkachuk	20	11	13	24	+12	74
Carter Verhaeghe	21	7	10	17	+7	8
Aleksander Barkov	21	5	11	16	+5	10
Sam Bennett	20	5	10	15	+5	60
Brandon Montour	21	8	5	13	+2	39
Sam Reinhart	21	8	5	13	0	12
Anthony Duclair	20	4	7	11	−6	16
Anton Lundell	21	2	8	10	+3	2
Gustav Forsling	21	2	6	8	+7	10
Aaron Ekblad	20	2	6	8	+9	20
Nick Cousins	21	2	5	7	0	16
Eetu Luostarinen	16	2	3	5	+2	4
Eric Staal	21	2	3	5	−4	12
Josh Mahura	21	0	3	3	−6	6
Radko Gudas	21	0	3	3	−5	34
Colin White	21	0	2	2	−9	6
Ryan Lomberg	13	1	0	1	−1	22
Zac Dalpe	13	1	0	1	−8	2
Grigori Denisenko	1	0	0	0	−3	0
Casey Fitzgerald	2	0	0	0	−1	10
Givani Smith	1	0	0	0	0	2
Marc Staal	21	0	0	0	0	10

=== Goaltenders ===
Regular season
Player	GP	GS	TOI	W	L	OT	GA	GAA	SA	SV%	SO	G	A	PIM
Sergei Bobrovsky	50	49	2,834:22	24	20	3	145	3.07	1,466	.901	1	0	0	2
Alex Lyon	15	14	893:11	9	4	2	43	2.89	488	.914	1	0	0	0
Spencer Knight	21	19	1,168:45	9	8	3	62	3.18	627	.901	1	0	1	0

Playoffs
Player	GP	GS	TOI	W	L	GA	GAA	SA	SV%	SO	G	A	PIM
Sergei Bobrovsky	19	18	1,164:21	12	6	54	2.78	639	.915	1	0	1	0
Alex Lyon	4	3	198:32	1	2	12	3.63	107	.888	0	0	0	0

- ^{†} Denotes player spent time with another team before joining the Panthers. Stats reflect time with the Panthers only.
- ^{‡} Denotes player was traded mid-season. Stats reflect time with the Panthers only.
- Bold/italics denotes franchise record.

== Transactions ==
The Panthers have been involved in the following transactions during the 2022–23 season.

Key:

† Contract is entry-level
‡ Contract initially takes effect in the 2023–24 season.

=== Trades ===
Date	Details		Ref
July 8, 2022	To Pittsburgh Penguins 7th-round pick in 2023	To Florida Panthers 7th-round pick in 2022	
July 22, 2022	To Calgary Flames Jonathan Huberdeau; Cole Schwindt; MacKenzie Weegar; Conditional^{1} 1st-round pick in 2025	To Florida Panthers Matthew Tkachuk; Conditional^{2} 4th-round pick in 2025	
December 19, 2022	To Anaheim Ducks Michael Del Zotto	To Florida Panthers Givani Smith	
December 19, 2022	To Detroit Red Wings Danny O'Regan	To Florida Panthers Givani Smith	
March 20, 2023	To Los Angeles Kings Cole Krygier	To Florida Panthers Future considerations	

Notes:

1. Calgary will receive Florida's 1st-round pick in 2026 instead if Florida's 1st-round pick in 2025 is within the top 2 selections.
2. Florida will receive Calgary's 4th-round pick in 2026 instead if Florida's 1st-round pick in 2025 is within the top 2 selections.

=== Players acquired ===
Date	Player	Former team	Term	Via	Ref
July 13, 2022	Anthony Bitetto	San Jose Sharks	1-year	Free agency	
July 13, 2022	Nick Cousins	Nashville Predators	2-year	Free agency	
July 13, 2022	Alex Lyon	Carolina Hurricanes	1-year	Free agency	
July 13, 2022	Marc Staal	Detroit Red Wings	1-year	Free agency	
July 13, 2022	Nathan Staios	Hamilton Bulldogs (OHL)	3-year†	Free agency	
July 13, 2022	Colin White	Ottawa Senators	1-year	Free agency	
July 14, 2022	Rudolfs Balcers	San Jose Sharks	1-year	Free agency	
July 15, 2022	Gerald Mayhew	Anaheim Ducks	1-year	Free agency	
July 16, 2022	Chris Tierney	Ottawa Senators	1-year	Free agency	
July 17, 2022	Michael Del Zotto	Ottawa Senators	1-year	Free agency	
September 20, 2022	Patrick Giles	Boston College Eagles (HE)	2-year†	Free agency	
October 10, 2022	Josh Mahura	Anaheim Ducks		Waivers	
October 21, 2022	Eric Staal	Iowa Wild (AHL)	1-year	Free agency	
March 3, 2023	Jean-Francois Berube	Charlotte Checkers (AHL)	1-year	Free agency	
March 3, 2023	Evan Fitzpatrick	Charlotte Checkers (AHL)	1-year	Free agency	
April 3, 2023	Ryan McAllister	University of Western Michigan (NCHC)	3-year†‡	Free agency	
April 18, 2023	Uvis Balinskis	Bili Tygri Liberec (ELH)	1-year†‡	Free agency	
June 12, 2023	Ludovic Waeber	ZSC Lions (NL)	1-year‡	Free agency	

=== Players lost ===
Date	Player	New team	Term	Via	Ref
July 13, 2022	Noel Acciari	St. Louis Blues	1-year	Free agency	
July 13, 2022	Ben Chiarot	Detroit Red Wings	4-year	Free agency	
July 13, 2022	Claude Giroux	Ottawa Senators	3-year	Free agency	
July 13, 2022	Jonas Johansson	Colorado Avalanche	1-year	Free agency	
July 13, 2022	Maxim Mamin	CSKA Moscow (KHL)	3-year	Free agency	
July 13, 2022	Mason Marchment	Dallas Stars	4-year	Free agency	
July 13, 2022	Markus Nutivaara	San Jose Sharks	1-year	Free agency	
July 13, 2022	Chase Priskie	Buffalo Sabres	1-year	Free agency	
July 25, 2022	Robert Hagg	Detroit Red Wings	1-year	Free agency	
August 2, 2022	Petteri Lindbohm	Frolunda HC (SHL)	1-year	Free agency	
August 24, 2022	German Rubtsov	Spartak Moscow (KHL)	1-year	Free agency	
October 10, 2022	Rudolfs Balcers	Tampa Bay Lightning		Waivers	
February 1, 2023	Anton Levtchi			Contract termination	
February 23, 2023	Chris Tierney	Montreal Canadiens		Waivers	
May 12, 2023	Logan Hutsko	IK Oskarshamn (SHL)	2-year‡	Free agency	

=== Signings ===
Date	Player	Term	Ref
July 8, 2022	Lucas Carlsson	1-year	
July 8, 2022	Eetu Luostarinen	2-year	
July 15, 2022	Evan Nause	3-year†	
July 26, 2022	Henry Bowlby	1-year	
September 27, 2022	Spencer Knight	3-year‡	
September 30, 2022	Kai Schwindt	3-year†	
February 10, 2023	Josh Mahura	1-year‡	
March 13, 2023	Marek Alscher	3-year†‡	
March 27, 2023	Zac Dalpe	2-year‡	
April 12, 2023	Michael Benning	3-year†‡	
May 8, 2023	Mackie Samoskevich	3-year†‡	

== Draft picks ==
Below are the Florida Panthers' selections at the 2022 NHL entry draft, which was held on July 7 and 8, 2022, at Bell Centre in Montreal.

Round	#	Player	Pos	Nationality	College/Junior/Club team (League)
3	93	Marek Alscher	D	Czech Republic	Portland Winterhawks (WHL)
4	125	Ludvig Jansson	D	Sweden	Sodertalje SK (HockeyAllsvenskan)
5	157	Sandis Vilmanis	LW	Latvia	Lulea HF (J20 Nationell)
6	186^{3}	Joshua Davies	C	Canada	Swift Current Broncos (WHL)
6	189	Tyler Muszelik	G	United States	U.S. National Team Development Program (USHL)
7	214^{4}	Liam Arnsby	C	Canada	North Bay Battalion (OHL)
7	221	Jack Devine	RW	United States	University of Denver (NCHC)

Notes:

1. The Florida Panthers' first-round pick will go to the Buffalo Sabres as the result of a trade on July 24, 2021, that sent Sam Reinhart to Florida in exchange for Devon Levi and this pick (being conditional at the time of the trade). The condition—Buffalo will receive a first-round pick in 2022 if Florida's first-round pick is outside of the top ten selections—was converted when the Panthers qualified for the 2022 Stanley Cup playoffs on April 3, 2022.
2. The Florida Panthers' second-round pick will go to the Seattle Kraken as the result of a trade on March 16, 2022, that sent Calle Jarnkrok to Calgary in exchange for a third-round pick in 2023, a seventh-round pick in 2024 and this pick.
3. The Toronto Maple Leafs' sixth-round pick went to the Florida Panthers as the result of a trade on March 21, 2022, that sent Tyler Inamoto to Columbus in exchange for Max Domi and this pick.
4. The Pittsburgh Penguins' seventh-round pick will go to the Florida Panthers as the result of a trade on July 8, 2022, that sent a seventh-round pick in 2023 to Pittsburgh in exchange for this pick.
