= 2022–23 Carolina Hurricanes season =

Season of play of professional ice hockey team

2022–23 Carolina Hurricanes
- Metropolitan Division champions
- Division: 1st Metropolitan
- Conference: 2nd Eastern
- 2022–23 record: 52–21–9
- Home record: 28–10–3
- Road record: 24–11–6
- Goals for: 266
- Goals against: 213

Team information
- General manager: Don Waddell
- Coach: Rod Brind'Amour
- Captain: Jordan Staal
- Alternate captains: Sebastian Aho; Jordan Martinook; Jaccob Slavin
- Arena: PNC Arena
- Average attendance: 19,526
- Minor league affiliates: Chicago Wolves (AHL); Norfolk Admirals (ECHL)

Team leaders
- Goals: Sebastian Aho (36)
- Assists: Brent Burns; Martin Necas (43)
- Points: Martin Necas (71)
- Penalty minutes: Andrei Svechnikov (71)
- Plus/minus: Jalen Chatfield (+23)
- Wins: Frederik Andersen (21)
- Goals against average: Antti Raanta (2.23)

The 2022–23 Carolina Hurricanes season was the 44th season for the National Hockey League (NHL) franchise that was established in June 1979, and 25th season since the franchise relocated from the Hartford Whalers to start the 1997–98 NHL season. The Hurricanes qualified for the playoffs on March 23, 2023, after the Florida Panthers lost to the Toronto Maple Leafs. In the playoffs, the Hurricanes defeated the New York Islanders in six games in the First Round, followed by a convincing five-game series win over the New Jersey Devils in the Second Round before being swept in four games by the Florida Panthers in the Eastern Conference Finals.

== Standings ==
=== Divisional standings ===
Metropolitan Division
Pos	Team	GP	W	L	OTL	RW	GF	GA	GD	Pts
1	y – Carolina Hurricanes	82	52	21	9	39	266	213	+53	113
2	x – New Jersey Devils	82	52	22	8	39	291	226	+65	112
3	x – New York Rangers	82	47	22	13	37	277	219	+58	107
4	x – New York Islanders	82	42	31	9	36	243	222	+21	93
5	Pittsburgh Penguins	82	40	31	11	31	262	264	−2	91
6	Washington Capitals	82	35	37	10	27	255	265	−10	80
7	Philadelphia Flyers	82	31	38	13	26	222	277	−55	75
8	Columbus Blue Jackets	82	25	48	9	15	214	330	−116	59

Source: National Hockey League
Rules for classification: 1) Fewer number of games played (GP, only during regular season); 2) Greater number of regulation wins (RW); 3) Greater number of wins in regulation and overtime, excluding shootout wins (ROW); 4) Greater number of total wins, including shootouts (W); 5) Greater number of points earned in head-to-head play; if teams played an uneven number of head-to-head games, the result of the first game on the home ice of the team with the extra home game is discarded; 6) Greater goal differential (GD); 7) Greater number of goals scored (GF)
x – Clinched playoff spot; y – Clinched division

=== Conference standings ===
Eastern Conference Wild Card
Pos	Div	Team	GP	W	L	OTL	RW	GF	GA	GD	Pts
1	ME	x – New York Islanders	82	42	31	9	36	243	222	+21	93
2	AT	x – Florida Panthers	82	42	32	8	36	290	273	+17	92
3	ME	Pittsburgh Penguins	82	40	31	11	31	262	264	−2	91
4	AT	Buffalo Sabres	82	42	33	7	30	296	300	−4	91
5	AT	Ottawa Senators	82	39	35	8	31	261	271	−10	86
6	AT	Detroit Red Wings	82	35	37	10	28	240	279	−39	80
7	ME	Washington Capitals	82	35	37	10	27	255	265	−10	80
8	ME	Philadelphia Flyers	82	31	38	13	26	222	277	−55	75
9	AT	Montreal Canadiens	82	31	45	6	21	232	307	−75	68
10	ME	Columbus Blue Jackets	82	25	48	9	15	214	330	−116	59

Source: National Hockey League
Rules for classification: 1) Fewer number of games played (GP, only during regular season); 2) Greater number of regulation wins (RW); 3) Greater number of wins in regulation and overtime, excluding shootout wins (ROW); 4) Greater number of total wins, including shootouts (W); 5) Greater number of points earned in head-to-head play; if teams played an uneven number of head-to-head games, the result of the first game on the home ice of the team with the extra home game is discarded; 6) Greater goal differential (GD); 7) Greater number of goals scored (GF)
x – Clinched playoff spot

== Schedule and results ==
=== Preseason ===
2022 preseason game log: 4–1–0 (Home: 3–0–0; Road: 1–1–0)

Game	Date	Opponent	Score	OT	Decision	Location	Attendance	Record	Recap
1	September 27	Tampa Bay Lightning	5–1		Andersen	PNC Arena	10,083	1–0	
—	September 28	@ Tampa Bay Lightning	Game postponed due to the impending threat from Hurricane Ian. Makeup date: TBA.						
2	September 29	@ Florida Panthers	5–2		Raanta	FLA Live Arena	6,156	2–0–0	
3	October 1	Florida Panthers	4–3	OT	Andersen	PNC Arena	14,843	3–0–0	
4	October 3	Columbus Blue Jackets	8–1		Raanta	PNC Arena	9,334	4–0–0	
5	October 4	@ Buffalo Sabres	2–4		Kochetkov	KeyBank Center	9,812	4–1–0	

=== Regular season ===
2022–23 game log
October: 6–2–1 (home: 2–1–0; road: 4–1–1)

Game	Date	Opponent	Score	OT	Decision	Location	Attendance	Record	Points	Recap
1	October 12	Columbus Blue Jackets	4–1		Andersen	PNC Arena	18,824	1–0–0	2	
2	October 14	@ San Jose Sharks	2–1		Raanta	SAP Center	17,562	2–0–0	4	
3	October 17	@ Seattle Kraken	5–1		Andersen	Climate Pledge Arena	17,151	3–0–0	6	
4	October 20	@ Edmonton Oilers	4–6		Andersen	Rogers Place	16,023	3–1–0	6	
5	October 22	@ Calgary Flames	2–3	OT	Raanta	Scotiabank Saddledome	17,210	3–1–1	7	
6	October 24	@ Vancouver Canucks	3–2		Andersen	Rogers Arena	18,775	4–1–1	9	
7	October 28	New York Islanders	2–6		Andersen	PNC Arena	18,680	4–2–1	9	
8	October 29	@ Philadelphia Flyers	4–3	OT	Raanta	Wells Fargo Center	13,335	5–2–1	11	
9	October 31	Washington Capitals	3–2	SO	Andersen	PNC Arena	16,211	6–2–1	13	

November: 6–4–4 (home: 3–2–1; road: 3–2–3)

Game	Date	Opponent	Score	OT	Decision	Location	Attendance	Record	Points	Recap
10	November 3	@ Tampa Bay Lightning	4–3	SO	Andersen	Amalie Arena	19,092	7–2–1	15	
11	November 4	Buffalo Sabres	5–3		Raanta	PNC Arena	18,727	8–2–1	17	
12	November 6	Toronto Maple Leafs	1–3		Andersen	PNC Arena	18,463	8–3–1	17	
13	November 9	@ Florida Panthers	0–3		Raanta	FLA Live Arena	13,225	8–4–1	17	
14	November 10	Edmonton Oilers	7–2		Kochetkov	PNC Arena	18,118	9–4–1	19	
15	November 12	@ Colorado Avalanche	1–4		Raanta	Ball Arena	18,127	10–4–1	21	
16	November 14	@ Chicago Blackhawks	3–0		Kochetkov	United Center	15,676	10–5–1	21	
17	November 17	Colorado Avalanche	2–3	OT	Raanta	PNC Arena	18,680	10–5–2	22	
18	November 19	@ Minnesota Wild	1–2	OT	Kochetkov	Xcel Energy Center	18,278	10–5–3	23	
19	November 21	@ Winnipeg Jets	3–4	OT	Kochetkov	Canada Life Centre	13,346	10–5–4	24	
20	November 23	Arizona Coyotes	0–4		Kochetkov	PNC Arena	18,775	10–6–4	24	
21	November 25	@ Boston Bruins	2–3	OT	Kochetkov	TD Garden	17,850	10–6–5	25	
22	November 26	Calgary Flames	3–2		Raanta	PNC Arena	18,845	11–6–5	27	
23	November 29	@ Pittsburgh Penguins	3–2	OT	Kochetkov	PPG Paints Arena	15,942	12–6–5	29	

December: 12–0–1 (home: 7–0–0; road: 5–0–1)

Game	Date	Opponent	Score	OT	Decision	Location	Attendance	Record	Points	Recap
24	December 1	@ St. Louis Blues	6–4		Kochetkov	Enterprise Center	18,096	13–6–5	31	
25	December 3	@ Los Angeles Kings	4–2		Kochetkov	Crypto.com Arena	16,067	14–6–5	33	
26	December 6	@ Anaheim Ducks	3–4	OT	Kochetkov	Honda Center	14,576	14–6–6	34	
27	December 10	@ New York Islanders	3–0		Kochetkov	UBS Arena	17,255	15–6–6	36	
28	December 13	@ Detroit Red Wings	1–0		Kochetkov	Little Caesars Arena	19,515	16–6–6	38	
29	December 15	Seattle Kraken	3–2		Kochetkov	PNC Arena	18,680	17–6–6	40	
30	December 17	Dallas Stars	5–4	OT	Raanta	PNC Arena	18,680	18–6–6	42	
31	December 18	Pittsburgh Penguins	3–2		Kochetkov	PNC Arena	18,117	19–6–6	44	
32	December 20	New Jersey Devils	4–1		Kochetkov	PNC Arena	18,680	20–6–6	46	
33	December 22	@ Pittsburgh Penguins	4–3	OT	Raanta	PPG Paints Arena	18,075	21–6–6	48	
34	December 23	Philadelphia Flyers	6–5		Raanta	PNC Arena	18,680	22–6–6	50	
35	December 27	Chicago Blackhawks	3–0		Raanta	PNC Arena	18,814	23–6–6	52	
36	December 30	Florida Panthers	4–0		Raanta	PNC Arena	18,767	24–6–6	54	

January: 9–3–2 (home: 5–2–1; road: 4–1–1)

Game	Date	Opponent	Score	OT	Decision	Location	Attendance	Record	Points	Recap
37	January 1	@ New Jersey Devils	5–4	SO	Raanta	Prudential Center	16,514	25–6–6	56	
38	January 3	@ New York Rangers	3–5		Kochetkov	Madison Square Garden	17,747	25–7–6	56	
39	January 5	Nashville Predators	3–5		Kochetkov	PNC Arena	18,344	25–8–6	56	
40	January 7	@ Columbus Blue Jackets	3–4	SO	Raanta	Nationwide Arena	18,663	25–8–7	57	
41	January 10	New Jersey Devils	3–5		Kochetkov	PNC Arena	18,092	25–9–7	57	
42	January 12	@ Columbus Blue Jackets	6–2		Andersen	Nationwide Arena	15,766	26–9–7	59	
43	January 14	Pittsburgh Penguins	2–1		Raanta	PNC Arena	18,769	27–9–7	61	
44	January 15	Vancouver Canucks	3–4	SO	Kochetkov	PNC Arena	18,680	27–9–8	62	
45	January 19	Minnesota Wild	5–2		Andersen	PNC Arena	18,013	28–9–8	64	
46	January 21	@ New York Islanders	5–2		Andersen	UBS Arena	17,255	29–9–8	66	
47	January 25	@ Dallas Stars	3–2	OT	Raanta	American Airlines Center	18,237	30–9–8	68	
48	January 27	San Jose Sharks	5–4	OT	Raanta	PNC Arena	18,780	31–9–8	70	
49	January 29	Boston Bruins	4–1		Andersen	PNC Arena	18,959	32–9–8	72	
50	January 31	Los Angeles Kings	5–4	OT	Andersen	PNC Arena	18,443	33–9–8	74	

February: 6–2–0 (home: 4–2–0; road: 2–0–0)

Game	Date	Opponent	Score	OT	Decision	Location	Attendance	Record	Points	Recap
51	February 1	@ Buffalo Sabres	5–1		Raanta	KeyBank Center	14,166	34–9–8	76	
52	February 11	New York Rangers	2–6		Andersen	PNC Arena	18,808	34–10–8	76	
53	February 14	@ Washington Capitals	3–2		Andersen	Capital One Arena	18,573	35–10–8	78	
54	February 16	Montreal Canadiens	6–2		Raanta	PNC Arena	18,680	36–10–8	80	
55	February 18	Washington Capitals	4–1		Andersen	Carter-Finley Stadium	56,961 (outdoors)	37–10–8	82	
56	February 21	St. Louis Blues	4–1		Andersen	PNC Arena	18,142	38–10–8	84	
57	February 24	Ottawa Senators	4–0		Raanta	PNC Arena	18,788	39–10–8	86	
58	February 25	Anaheim Ducks	2–3		Andersen	PNC Arena	18,818	39–11–8	86	

March: 8–7–1 (home: 4–3–1; road: 4–4–0)

Game	Date	Opponent	Score	OT	Decision	Location	Attendance	Record	Points	Recap
59	March 1	@ Vegas Golden Knights	2–3		Andersen	T-Mobile Arena	17,699	39–12–8	86	
60	March 3	@ Arizona Coyotes	6–1		Raanta	Mullett Arena	4,600	40–12–8	88	
61	March 5	Tampa Bay Lightning	6–0		Andersen	PNC Arena	18,965	41–12–8	90	
62	March 7	@ Montreal Canadiens	4–3	SO	Andersen	Bell Centre	21,105	42–12–8	92	
63	March 9	Philadelphia Flyers	1–0		Kochetkov	PNC Arena	18,680	43–12–8	94	
64	March 11	Vegas Golden Knights	0–4		Andersen	PNC Arena	18,813	43–13–8	94	
65	March 12	@ New Jersey Devils	0–3		Kochetkov	Prudential Center	16,514	43–14–8	94	
66	March 14	Winnipeg Jets	5–3		Andersen	PNC Arena	18,680	44–14–8	96	
67	March 17	@ Toronto Maple Leafs	2–5		Kochetkov	Scotiabank Arena	18,607	44–15–8	96	
68	March 18	@ Philadelphia Flyers	5–4	OT	Andersen	Wells Fargo Center	18,975	45–15–8	98	
69	March 21	@ New York Rangers	3–2		Andersen	Madison Square Garden	18,006	46–15–8	100	
70	March 23	New York Rangers	1–2		Andersen	PNC Arena	18,792	46–16–8	100	
71	March 25	Toronto Maple Leafs	5–3		Kochetkov	PNC Arena	18,895	47–16–8	102	
72	March 26	Boston Bruins	3–4	SO	Andersen	PNC Arena	18,958	47–16–9	103	
73	March 28	Tampa Bay Lightning	0–4		Kochetkov	PNC Arena	18,680	47–17–9	103	
74	March 30	@ Detroit Red Wings	2–3		Andersen	Little Caesars Arena	19,183	47–18–9	103	

April: 5–3–0 (home: 3–0–0; road: 2–3–0)

Game	Date	Opponent	Score	OT	Decision	Location	Attendance	Record	Points	Recap
75	April 1	@ Montreal Canadiens	3–0		Raanta	Bell Centre	21,105	48–18–9	105	
76	April 2	New York Islanders	2–1		Andersen	PNC Arena	18,725	49–18–9	107	
77	April 4	Ottawa Senators	3–2	OT	Raanta	PNC Arena	18,680	50–18–9	109	
78	April 6	@ Nashville Predators	0–3		Andersen	Bridgestone Arena	17,762	50–19–9	109	
79	April 8	@ Buffalo Sabres	3–4		Raanta	KeyBank Center	18,199	50–20–9	109	
80	April 10	@ Ottawa Senators	2–3		Andersen	Canadian Tire Centre	18,688	50–21–9	109	
81	April 11	Detroit Red Wings	4–1		Raanta	PNC Arena	18,680	51–21–9	111	
82	April 13	@ Florida Panthers	6–4		Andersen	FLA Live Arena	19,160	52–21–9	113	

2022–23 schedule

Win (2 Points) Loss (0 points) Overtime/shootout loss (1 point)

=== Playoffs ===
2023 Stanley Cup playoffs

Eastern Conference First Round vs. (WC1) New York Islanders: Carolina won 4–2
#	Date	Visitor	Score	Home	OT	Decision	Attendance	Series	Recap
1	April 17	NY Islanders	1–2	Carolina		Raanta	18,680	1–0
2	April 19	NY Islanders	3–4	Carolina	OT	Raanta	18,680	2–0
3	April 21	Carolina	1–5	NY Islanders		Raanta	17,255	2–1
4	April 23	Carolina	5–2	NY Islanders		Raanta	17,255	3–1
5	April 25	NY Islanders	3–2	Carolina		Raanta	18,680	3–2
6	April 28	Carolina	2–1	NY Islanders	OT	Andersen	17,255	4–2

Eastern Conference Second Round vs. (M2) New Jersey Devils: Carolina won 4–1
#	Date	Visitor	Score	Home	OT	Decision	Attendance	Series	Recap
1	May 3	New Jersey	1–5	Carolina		Andersen	18,735	1–0
2	May 5	New Jersey	1–6	Carolina		Andersen	18,982	2–0
3	May 7	Carolina	4–8	New Jersey		Kochetkov	16,514	2–1
4	May 9	Carolina	6–1	New Jersey		Andersen	17,016	3–1
5	May 11	New Jersey	2–3	Carolina	OT	Andersen	18,841	4–1

Eastern Conference Final vs. (WC2) Florida Panthers: Florida won 4–0
#	Date	Visitor	Score	Home	OT	Decision	Attendance	Series	Recap
1	May 18	Florida	3–2	Carolina	4OT	Andersen	18,680	0–1
2	May 20	Florida	2–1	Carolina	OT	Raanta	18,854	0–2
3	May 22	Carolina	0–1	Florida		Andersen	19,873	0–3
4	May 24	Carolina	3–4	Florida		Andersen	20,065	0–4

Legend: Win Loss

== Player statistics ==
=== Skaters ===
Regular season
Player	GP	G	A	Pts	+/−	PIM
Martin Necas	82	28	43	71	+5	32
Sebastian Aho	75	36	31	67	+8	42
Brent Burns	82	18	43	61	+19	44
Andrei Svechnikov	64	23	32	55	+6	71
Jesperi Kotkaniemi	82	18	25	43	+10	50
Seth Jarvis	82	14	25	39	+10	12
Brady Skjei	81	18	20	38	+7	40
Teuvo Teravainen	68	12	25	37	+11	16
Stefan Noesen	78	13	23	36	+11	32
Jordan Staal	81	17	17	34	+7	32
Jordan Martinook	82	13	21	34	+7	61
Brett Pesce	82	5	25	30	+11	43
Jesper Fast	80	10	19	29	+9	16
Jaccob Slavin	76	7	20	27	+18	8
Paul Stastny	73	9	13	22	+4	16
Jalen Chatfield	78	6	8	14	+23	35
Calvin de Haan	53	2	10	12	+7	20
Derek Stepan	73	5	6	11	+8	8
Shayne Gostisbehere^{†}	23	3	7	10	+1	4
Jack Drury	38	2	6	8	+3	14
Max Pacioretty	5	3	0	3	0	2
Dylan Coghlan	17	0	3	3	−1	2
Jesse Puljujarvi^{†}	17	0	2	2	−2	2
Maxime Lajoie	3	0	0	0	0	0
Ondrej Kase	1	0	0	0	0	0

Playoffs
Player	GP	G	A	Pts	+/−	PIM
Sebastian Aho	15	5	7	12	+6	12
Jordan Martinook	15	3	9	12	+4	8
Seth Jarvis	15	5	5	10	+7	0
Jesper Fast	15	6	3	9	+2	2
Brent Burns	15	2	7	9	+6	20
Stefan Noesen	15	4	4	8	−3	11
Jordan Staal	15	2	6	8	+4	6
Martin Necas	15	4	3	7	−2	2
Jesperi Kotkaniemi	15	3	4	7	−5	8
Brett Pesce	15	2	4	6	−4	12
Jaccob Slavin	15	2	4	6	+12	2
Paul Stastny	15	4	0	4	−1	4
Jalen Chatfield	15	1	3	4	+1	14
Brady Skjei	15	1	3	4	−2	12
Jack Drury	13	0	3	3	+2	10
Shayne Gostisbehere	15	0	3	3	−2	6
Mackenzie MacEachern	8	1	1	2	+4	6
Teuvo Teravainen	6	1	0	1	0	2
Jesse Puljujarvi	7	0	1	1	−3	0
Derek Stepan	11	0	1	1	−4	2

=== Goaltenders ===
Regular season
Player	GP	GS	TOI	W	L	OT	GA	GAA	SA	SV%	SO	G	A	PIM
Frederik Andersen	34	33	1,984:21	21	11	1	82	2.48	849	.903	1	0	1	0
Antti Raanta	27	26	1,561:13	19	3	3	58	2.23	644	.910	4	0	0	0
Pyotr Kochetkov	24	23	1,403:56	12	7	5	57	2.44	627	.909	4	0	0	0

Playoffs
Player	GP	GS	TOI	W	L	GA	GAA	SA	SV%	SO	G	A	PIM
Frederik Andersen	9	9	590:18	5	3	18	1.83	245	.927	0	0	0	0
Antti Raanta	6	6	363:11	3	3	15	2.48	165	.909	0	0	0	0
Pyotr Kochetkov	1	0	39:07	0	1	4	6.14	22	.818	0	0	0	0

^{†}Denotes player spent time with another team before joining the Hurricanes. Stats reflect time with the Hurricanes only.
^{‡}Denotes player was traded mid-season. Stats reflect time with the Hurricanes only.
Bold/italics denotes franchise record.

== Transactions ==
The Hurricanes have been involved in the following transactions during the 2022–23 season.

Key:

† Contract is entry-level.
‡ Contract initially takes effect in the 2023–24 NHL season.

=== Trades ===
Date	Details		Ref
July 8, 2022	To Philadelphia Flyers Tony DeAngelo; 7th-round pick in 2022	To Carolina Hurricanes 2nd-round pick in 2024; Conditional^{1} 3rd-round pick in 2023; 4th-round pick in 2022	
July 8, 2022	To Chicago Blackhawks 6th-round pick in 2022	To Carolina Hurricanes 6th-round pick in 2023	
July 13, 2022	To San Jose Sharks Steven Lorentz; Eetu Makiniemi; Conditional^{2} 3rd-round pick in 2023	To Carolina Hurricanes Brent Burns; Lane Pederson	
July 13, 2022	To Vegas Golden Knights Future considerations	To Carolina Hurricanes Max Pacioretty; Dylan Coghlan	
October 28, 2022	To Vancouver Canucks Ethan Bear; Lane Pederson	To Carolina Hurricanes 5th-round pick in 2023	
November 30, 2022	To Vegas Golden Knights Future considerations	To Carolina Hurricanes Zack Hayes	
February 28, 2023	To Edmonton Oilers Patrik Puistola	To Carolina Hurricanes Jesse Puljujarvi	
March 1, 2023	To Arizona Coyotes 3rd-round pick in 2026	To Carolina Hurricanes Shayne Gostisbehere	
March 10, 2023	To New Jersey Devils Zack Hayes	To Carolina Hurricanes Jack Dugan	

Notes:

1. Carolina will receive the lower of Florida's, Philadelphia's, or the New York Rangers' 3rd-round pick in 2023.
2. San Jose will receive the lower of Carolina's or Philadelphia's 3rd-round pick in 2023.

=== Players acquired ===
Date	Player	Former team	Term	Via	Ref
July 13, 2022	Ondrej Kase	Toronto Maple Leafs	1-year	Free agency	
July 14, 2022	Zach Sawchenko	San Jose Sharks	1-year	Free agency	
July 15, 2022	Mackenzie MacEachern	St. Louis Blues	1-year	Free agency	
July 15, 2022	Malte Stromwall	Dinamo Minsk (KHL)	1-year	Free agency	
July 25, 2022	Ryan Dzingel	San Jose Sharks	1-year	Free agency	
July 25, 2022	William Lagesson	Montreal Canadiens	1-year	Free agency	
August 23, 2022	Paul Stastny	Winnipeg Jets	1-year	Free agency	
October 1, 2022	Calvin de Haan	Chicago Blackhawks	1-year	Free agency	
April 11, 2023	Yaniv Perets	Quinnipiac Bobcats (ECAC)	2-year†‡	Free agency	

=== Players lost ===
Date	Player	New team	Term	Via	Ref
July 13, 2022	Ian Cole	Tampa Bay Lightning	1-year	Free agency	
July 13, 2022	Max Domi	Chicago Blackhawks	1-year	Free agency	
July 13, 2022	Josh Jacobs	Colorado Avalanche	1-year	Free agency	
July 13, 2022	Alex Lyon	Florida Panthers	1-year	Free agency	
July 13, 2022	Andrew Poturalski	Seattle Kraken	2-year	Free agency	
July 13, 2022	Spencer Smallman	Colorado Avalanche	2-year	Free agency	
July 13, 2022	Brendan Smith	New Jersey Devils	2-year	Free agency	
July 13, 2022	Vincent Trocheck	New York Rangers	7-year	Free agency	
July 14, 2022	Josh Leivo	St. Louis Blues	1-year	Free agency	
July 18, 2022	Beck Warm	Rochester Americans (AHL)	1-year	Free agency	
July 21, 2022	Nino Niederreiter	Nashville Predators	2-year	Free agency	
July 25, 2022	Joey Keane	Spartak Moscow (KHL))	1-year	Free agency	
July 25, 2022	Jack LaFontaine	Syracuse Crunch (AHL)	1-year	Free agency	
August 2, 2022	C. J. Smith	New York Rangers	1-year	Free agency	
August 4, 2022	Sam Miletic	Östersunds IK (HockeyAllsvenskan)		Free agency	
September 22, 2022	David Cotton	Coachella Valley Firebirds (AHL)	1-year	Free agency	

=== Signings ===
Date	Player	Term	Ref
July 12, 2022	Stefan Noesen	2-year	
July 25, 2022	Stelio Mattheos	1-year	
July 28, 2022	Ethan Bear	1-year	
August 6, 2022	Maxime Lajoie	1-year	
August 9, 2022	Martin Necas	2-year	
August 17, 2022	Anttoni Honka	3-year†	
October 19, 2022	Derek Stepan	1-year	
November 23, 2022	Pyotr Kochetkov	4-year‡	
April 14, 2023	Domenick Fensore	2-year†‡	
May 31, 2023	Justin Robidas	3-year†‡	
June 25, 2023	Jordan Staal	4-year‡	

== Draft picks ==
Below are the Carolina Hurricanes' selections at the 2022 NHL entry draft, which were held on July 7 to 8, 2022. It was held at the Bell Centre in Montreal, Quebec.

Round	#	Player	Pos.	Nationality	Team (League)
2	60	Gleb Trikozov	LW	Russia	Omskie Yastreby (MHL)
3	71^{2}	Alexander Perevalov	LW	Russia	Loko Yaroslavl (MHL)
4	101^{4}	Simon Forsmark	D	Sweden	Örebro HK (SHL)
4	124	Cruz Lucius	RW	United States	U.S. NTDP (USHL)
5	156	Vladimir Grudinin	D	Russia	Krasnaya Armiya (MHL)
6	171^{5}	Jakub Vondras	G	Czech Republic	HC Plzen (Czech U20)
7	205^{7}	Alexander Pelevin	D	Russia	Chaika Nizhny Novgorod (MHL)

1. The Carolina Hurricanes' first-round pick went to the Montreal Canadiens as compensation for not matching an offer sheet from Carolina to restricted free agent Jesperi Kotkaniemi on September 4, 2021.
2. The Chicago Blackhawks' third-round pick went to the Carolina Hurricanes as the result of a trade on July 24, 2021, that sent a third-round pick in 2021 to Chicago in exchange for this pick.
3. The Carolina Hurricanes' third-round pick went to the Montreal Canadiens as compensation for not matching an offer sheet from Carolina to restricted free agent Jesperi Kotkaniemi on September 4, 2021.
4. The Philadelphia Flyers' fourth-round pick went to the Carolina Hurricanes as the result of a trade on July 8, 2022, that sent Tony DeAngelo and a seventh-round pick in 2022 (220th overall) to Philadelphia in exchange for a conditional third-round pick in 2023, a second-round pick in 2024 and this pick.
5. The Anaheim Ducks' sixth-round pick went to the Carolina Hurricanes as the result of a trade on April 12, 2021, that sent Haydn Fleury to Anaheim in exchange for Jani Hakanpaa and this pick.
6. The Carolina Hurricanes' sixth-round pick went to the Chicago Blackhawks as the result of a trade on July 8, 2022, that sent a sixth-round pick in 2023 to Carolina in exchange for this pick.
7. The Columbus Blue Jackets' seventh-round pick went to the Carolina Hurricanes as the result of a trade on February 13, 2021, that sent Gregory Hofmann to Columbus in exchange for this pick.
8. The Carolina Hurricanes' seventh-round pick went to the Philadelphia Flyers as the result of a trade on July 8, 2022, that sent a fourth-round pick in 2022 (101st overall), a conditional third-round pick in 2023 and a second-round pick in 2024 to Carolina in exchange for Tony DeAngelo and this pick.
