= Colton White =

Canadian ice hockey player (born 1997)

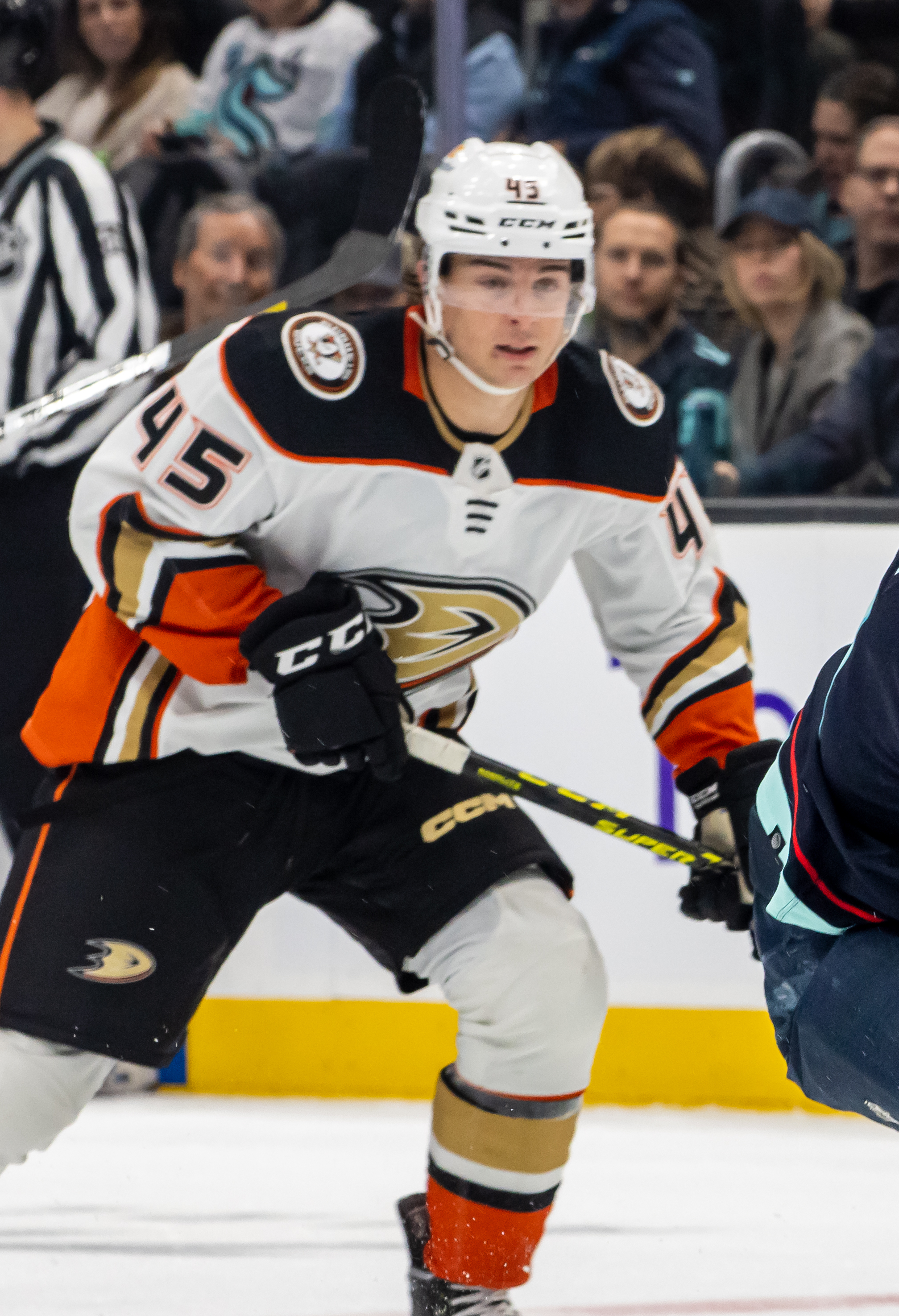
- White on the Anaheim Ducks in 2023
- Born: May 3, 1997 (age 29) London, Ontario, Canada
- Height: 6 ft 1 in (185 cm)
- Weight: 185 lb (84 kg; 13 st 3 lb)
- Position: Defence
- Shoots: Left
- NHL team (P) Cur. team Former teams: Columbus Blue Jackets; Cleveland Monsters (AHL); New Jersey Devils; Anaheim Ducks
- NHL draft: 97th overall, 2015; New Jersey Devils
- Playing career: 2017–present

Colton White (born May 3, 1997) is a Canadian professional ice hockey defenceman for the Cleveland Monsters of the American Hockey League (AHL) while under contract to the Columbus Blue Jackets of the National Hockey League (NHL). He was selected by the New Jersey Devils, 97th overall, in the 2015 NHL entry draft. He has previously played for the Devils and Anaheim Ducks.

== Playing career ==
White played minor midget hockey with the London Jr. Knights before he was selected in the 2013 Ontario Hockey League (OHL) Priority Selection, 22nd overall, by the Sault Ste. Marie Greyhounds. He joined the Greyhounds as a rookie for the 2013–14 season. White played with the Greyhounds for his entire 256-game OHL career and was an alternate captain in the 2015–16 and 2016–17 seasons.

White was drafted by the New Jersey Devils of the National Hockey League (NHL) in the fourth round, 97th overall, of the 2015 NHL entry draft. On September 22, 2016, White was signed by the Devils to a three-year, entry-level contract. In his first pro season in 2017–18 season, White played 11 games with the Adirondack Thunder of the ECHL, spending the rest of the season with the Devils American Hockey League (AHL) affiliate, the Binghamton Devils, appearing in 47 games, scoring 2 goals and 9 points. During the 2018–19 season, having played 61 games with Binghamton, White received his first NHL recall by New Jersey on March 13, 2019. He made his NHL debut that day, helping the Devils blueline in a 6–3 victory over the Edmonton Oilers at Rogers Arena in Edmonton, Alberta. He finished the season playing in three games for New Jersey, going scoreless. In the 2019–20 season, White was recalled in February due to an injury to Sami Vatanen and an illness with P.K. Subban. He made his season debut against the Montreal Canadiens on February 4, 2020. He played in six games, going scoreless. In the pandemic-shortened 2020–21 season, White made two appearances with New Jersey going scoreless, but spent the majority of the season with Binghamton, appearing in 27 games, scoring one goal and seven points. He was named an alternate captain with Binghamton for the season.

White signed a one-year, two-way contract with the Devils on July 14, 2021. He made the New Jersey Devils out of training camp, appearing in the opening day roster. He registered his first NHL point on October 19, assisting on Jimmy Vesey's second period goal in a 4–2 victory over the Seattle Kraken. However, after Ty Smith returned from injury, White was placed on waivers and went unclaimed. He was assigned to the Devils' new AHL affiliate, the Utica Comets, and spent the rest of the season splitting time between the two. He finished the season with four points (all assists) in 27 games with New Jersey and three points (all goals) in six games with Utica.

Following his fifth season within the Devils organization, White left as an unrestricted free agent and was signed to a two-year, two-way contract with the Anaheim Ducks on July 14, 2022. In his first season with the Ducks, he played in 46 games, scoring six points. At the beginning of the 2023–24 season, White was placed on waivers and after going unclaimed, was assigned to Anaheim's AHL affiliate, the San Diego Gulls. He appeared in 53 games with San Diego, scoring one goal and eight points.

At the conclusion of his contract with the Ducks, White returned to the Devils as a free agent, signing a two-year, two-way contract on July 1, 2024. After going unclaimed on waivers, he was assigned to Utica for the 2024–25 season.

As a free agent at the conclusion of his second tenure with the Devils, White was signed to a two-year, two-way contract with the Columbus Blue Jackets on July 6, 2026.

== Career statistics ==
			Regular season					Playoffs
Season	Team	League	GP	G	A	Pts	PIM	GP	G	A	Pts	PIM
2013–14	Sault Ste. Marie Greyhounds	OHL	57	0	5	5	2	9	0	1	1	0
2014–15	Sault Ste. Marie Greyhounds	OHL	67	6	16	22	30	14	0	2	2	0
2015–16	Sault Ste. Marie Greyhounds	OHL	68	9	26	35	13	12	1	2	3	4
2016–17	Sault Ste. Marie Greyhounds	OHL	64	6	25	31	41	11	0	3	3	8
2017–18	Binghamton Devils	AHL	47	2	7	9	32	—	—	—	—	—
2017–18	Adirondack Thunder	ECHL	11	2	2	4	6	14	3	8	11	8
2018–19	Binghamton Devils	AHL	71	7	23	30	29	—	—	—	—	—
2018–19	New Jersey Devils	NHL	3	0	0	0	2	—	—	—	—	—
2019–20	Binghamton Devils	AHL	45	1	11	12	12	—	—	—	—	—
2019–20	New Jersey Devils	NHL	6	0	0	0	4	—	—	—	—	—
2020–21	Binghamton Devils	AHL	27	1	6	7	8	—	—	—	—	—
2020–21	New Jersey Devils	NHL	2	0	0	0	0	—	—	—	—	—
2021–22	New Jersey Devils	NHL	27	0	4	4	8	—	—	—	—	—
2021–22	Utica Comets	AHL	6	3	0	3	6	—	—	—	—	—
2022–23	Anaheim Ducks	NHL	46	0	6	6	8	—	—	—	—	—
2022–23	San Diego Gulls	AHL	5	1	0	1	6	—	—	—	—	—
2023–24	San Diego Gulls	AHL	53	1	7	8	28	—	—	—	—	—
2024–25	Utica Comets	AHL	61	4	17	21	47	—	—	—	—	—
2025–26	Utica Comets	AHL	30	1	6	7	29	—	—	—	—	—
2025–26	New Jersey Devils	NHL	23	0	4	4	2	—	—	—	—	—
NHL totals			107	0	14	14	24	—	—	—	—	—
