= 2022–23 San Jose Sharks season =

33nd season of the San Jose Sharks

2022–23 San Jose Sharks
- Division: 7th Pacific
- Conference: 14th Western
- 2022–23 record: 22–44–16
- Home record: 8–22–11
- Road record: 14–22–5
- Goals for: 234
- Goals against: 321

Team information
- General manager: Mike Grier
- Coach: David Quinn
- Captain: Logan Couture
- Alternate captains: Nick Bonino (Oct. 1 – Mar. 3); Mario Ferraro; Tomas Hertl; Erik Karlsson
- Arena: SAP Center
- Average attendance: 13,912
- Minor league affiliates: San Jose Barracuda (AHL); Wichita Thunder (ECHL)

Team leaders
- Goals: Timo Meier (31)
- Assists: Erik Karlsson (76)
- Points: Erik Karlsson (101)
- Penalty minutes: Jonah Gadjovich (57)
- Plus/minus: Jaycob Megna (+6)
- Wins: James Reimer (12)
- Goals against average: Eetu Makiniemi (2.13)

The 2022–23 San Jose Sharks season was the 32nd season for the National Hockey League (NHL) franchise that was established on May 9, 1990.

Bob Boughner was fired on July 1, 2022, and replaced by David Quinn. Mike Grier also joined as general manager, replacing Doug Wilson.

On March 14, 2023, the Sharks were eliminated from playoff contention after an overtime loss to the Columbus Blue Jackets.

== Standings ==
=== Divisional standings ===
Pacific Division
Pos	Team	GP	W	L	OTL	RW	GF	GA	GD	Pts
1	z – Vegas Golden Knights	82	51	22	9	38	272	229	+43	111
2	x – Edmonton Oilers	82	50	23	9	45	325	260	+65	109
3	x – Los Angeles Kings	82	47	25	10	37	280	257	+23	104
4	x – Seattle Kraken	82	46	28	8	37	289	256	+33	100
5	Calgary Flames	82	38	27	17	31	260	252	+8	93
6	Vancouver Canucks	82	38	37	7	24	276	298	−22	83
7	San Jose Sharks	82	22	44	16	16	234	321	−87	60
8	Anaheim Ducks	82	23	47	12	13	209	338	−129	58

Source: National Hockey League
Rules for classification: 1) Fewer number of games played (GP, only during regular season); 2) Greater number of regulation wins (RW); 3) Greater number of wins in regulation and overtime, excluding shootout wins (ROW); 4) Greater number of total wins, including shootouts (W); 5) Greater number of points earned in head-to-head play; if teams played an uneven number of head-to-head games, the result of the first game on the home ice of the team with the extra home game is discarded; 6) Greater goal differential (GD); 7) Greater number of goals scored (GF)
x – Clinched playoff spot; z – Clinched conference

=== Conference standings ===
Western Conference Wild Card
Pos	Div	Team	GP	W	L	OTL	RW	GF	GA	GD	Pts
1	PA	x – Seattle Kraken	82	46	28	8	37	289	256	+33	100
2	CE	x – Winnipeg Jets	82	46	33	3	36	247	225	+22	95
3	PA	Calgary Flames	82	38	27	17	31	260	252	+8	93
4	CE	Nashville Predators	82	42	32	8	29	229	238	−9	92
5	PA	Vancouver Canucks	82	38	37	7	24	276	298	−22	83
6	CE	St. Louis Blues	82	37	38	7	27	263	301	−38	81
7	CE	Arizona Coyotes	82	28	40	14	20	228	299	−71	70
8	PA	San Jose Sharks	82	22	44	16	16	234	321	−87	60
9	CE	Chicago Blackhawks	82	26	49	7	18	204	301	−97	59
10	PA	Anaheim Ducks	82	23	47	12	13	209	338	−129	58

Source: National Hockey League
Rules for classification: 1) Fewer number of games played (GP, only during regular season); 2) Greater number of regulation wins (RW); 3) Greater number of wins in regulation and overtime, excluding shootout wins (ROW); 4) Greater number of total wins, including shootouts (W); 5) Greater number of points earned in head-to-head play; if teams played an uneven number of head-to-head games, the result of the first game on the home ice of the team with the extra home game is discarded; 6) Greater goal differential (GD); 7) Greater number of goals scored (GF)
x – Clinched playoff spot

== Schedule ==
=== Preseason ===
The preseason schedule was announced on July 6, 2022.

Preseason game log

2022 preseason game log: 5–1–0 (home: 2–0–0; away: 3–1–0)
#	Date	Visitor	Score	Home	OT	Decision	Attendance	Record	Recap
1	September 25	Los Angeles	2–3	San Jose	OT	Kahkonen	9,042	1–0–0	Recap
2	September 27	Anaheim	4–5	San Jose		Reimer	8,030	2–0–0	Recap
3	September 28	San Jose	3–1	Los Angeles		Dell		3–0–0	Recap
4^{A}	September 30	San Jose	1–4	Anaheim		Kahkonen	13,616	3–1–0	Recap
5^{A}	September 30	San Jose	7–3	Las Vegas		Reimer	17,446	4–1–0	Recap
6^{B}	October 4	San Jose	3–1	Eisbären Berlin		Reimer	12,013	5–1–0	Recap

Legend: Win Loss Overtime/shootout loss

^{A} – Split squad game ^{B} – International game

=== Regular season ===
The regular season schedule was announced on July 6, 2022, and began with two games against the Nashville Predators at O2 Arena in Prague for the NHL Global Series.

2022–23 game log: 22–44–16 (home: 8–22–11; away: 14–22–5)

October: 3–8–0 (home: 1–5–0; away: 2–3–0)
#	Date	Visitor	Score	Home	OT	Decision	Attendance	Record	Pts	Recap
1	October 7	San Jose	1–4	Nashville		Reimer	16,648	0–1–0	0	Recap
2	October 8	Nashville	3–2	San Jose		Kahkonen	17,023	0–2–0	0	Recap
3	October 14	Carolina	2–1	San Jose		Reimer	17,562	0–3–0	0	Recap
4	October 15	Chicago	5–2	San Jose		Kahkonen	15,219	0–4–0	0	Recap
5	October 18	San Jose	2–5	NY Islanders		Reimer	13,892	0–5–0	0	Recap
6	October 20	San Jose	3–2	NY Rangers	OT	Reimer	17,083	1–5–0	2	Recap
7	October 22	San Jose	1–2	New Jersey		Kahkonen	11,037	1–6–0	2	Recap
8	October 23	San Jose	3–0	Philadelphia		Reimer	14,512	2–6–0	4	Recap
9	October 25	Vegas	4–2	San Jose		Reimer	12,003	2–7–0	4	Recap
10	October 27	Toronto	3–4	San Jose	OT	Kahkonen	12,507	3–7–0	6	Recap
11	October 29	Tampa Bay	4–3	San Jose		Reimer	15,122	3–8–0	6	Recap

November: 5–6–4 (home: 1–3–4; away: 4–3–0)
#	Date	Visitor	Score	Home	OT	Decision	Attendance	Record	Pts	Recap
12	November 1	Anaheim	6–5	San Jose	SO	Kahkonen	10,058	3–8–1	7	Recap
13	November 3	Florida	4–3	San Jose	SO	Reimer	10,182	3–8–2	8	Recap
14	November 5	Anaheim	5–4	San Jose	SO	Reimer	17,562	3–8–3	9	Recap
15	November 10	San Jose	3–5	St. Louis		Kahkonen	18,096	3–9–3	9	Recap
16	November 11	San Jose	5–4	Dallas		Reimer	18,532	4–9–3	11	Recap
17	November 13	San Jose	3–2	Minnesota	SO	Reimer	17,105	5–9–3	13	Recap
18	November 15	San Jose	5–2	Vegas		Reimer	17,899	6–9–3	15	Recap
19	November 17	Detroit	7–4	San Jose		Reimer	14,134	6–10–3	15	Recap
20	November 19	NY Rangers	2–1	San Jose		Reimer	17,562	6–11–3	15	Recap
21	November 21	Ottawa	1–5	San Jose		Kahkonen	11,295	7–11–3	17	Recap
22	November 23	San Jose	5–8	Seattle		Kahkonen	17,151	7–12–3	17	Recap
23	November 25	Los Angeles	5–2	San Jose		Reimer	17,562	7–13–3	17	Recap
24	November 27	Vancouver	4–3	San Jose	OT	Kahkonen	11,307	7–13–4	18	Recap
25	November 29	San Jose	4–0	Montreal		Kahkonen	21,105	8–13–4	20	Recap
26	November 30	San Jose	1–3	Toronto		Dell	18,679	8–14–4	20	Recap

December: 3–6–3 (home: 2–2–2; away: 1–4–1)
#	Date	Visitor	Score	Home	OT	Decision	Attendance	Record	Pts	Recap
27	December 3	San Jose	2–5	Ottawa		Kahkonen	17,101	8–15–4	20	Recap
28	December 4	San Jose	3–6	Buffalo		Dell	13,655	8–16–4	20	Recap
29	December 7	Vancouver	6–5	San Jose	OT	Makiniemi	11,492	8–16–5	21	Recap
30	December 9	San Jose	6–1	Anaheim		Makiniemi	14,487	9–16–5	23	Recap
31	December 13	Arizona	2–3	San Jose		Reimer	10,462	10–16–5	25	Recap
32	December 17	San Jose	2–3	Los Angeles	SO	Reimer	18,230	10–16–6	26	Recap
33	December 18	Calgary	5–2	San Jose		Kahkonen	14,207	10–17–6	26	Recap
34	December 20	Calgary	7–3	San Jose		Reimer	10,431	10–18–6	26	Recap
35	December 22	Minnesota	2–5	San Jose		Reimer	13,128	11–18–6	28	Recap
36	December 27	San Jose	2–6	Vancouver		Reimer	18,875	11–19–6	28	Recap
37	December 29	Philadelphia	4–3	San Jose	OT	Kahkonen	17,562	11–19–7	29	Recap
38	December 31	San Jose	2–5	Dallas		Reimer	18,532	11–20–7	29	Recap

January: 4–5–4 (home: 1–2–1; away: 3–3–3)
#	Date	Visitor	Score	Home	OT	Decision	Attendance	Record	Pts	Recap
39	January 1	San Jose	5–2	Chicago		Kahkonen	19,047	12–20–7	31	Recap
40	January 6	San Jose	4–5	Anaheim	OT	Kahkonen	16,281	12–20–8	32	Recap
41	January 7	Boston	4–2	San Jose		Reimer	17,562	12–21–8	32	Recap
42	January 10	San Jose	4–2	Arizona		Kahkonen	4,600	13–21–8	34	Recap
43	January 11	San Jose	3–4	Los Angeles		Reimer	16,717	13–22–8	34	Recap
44	January 13	Edmonton	7–1	San Jose		Kahkonen	15,887	13–23–8	34	Recap
45	January 16	New Jersey	4–3	San Jose	SO	Reimer	13,293	13–23–9	35	Recap
46	January 18	Dallas	3–5	San Jose		Reimer	12,315	14–23–9	37	Recap
47	January 21	San Jose	3–5	Columbus		Kahkonen	18,807	14–24–9	37	Recap
48	January 22	San Jose	0–4	Boston		Reimer	17,850	14–25–9	37	Recap
49	January 24	San Jose	2–3	Detroit	OT	Reimer	19,515	14–25–10	38	Recap
50	January 27	San Jose	4–5	Carolina	OT	Reimer	18,780	14–25–11	39	Recap
51	January 28	San Jose	6–4	Pittsburgh		Kahkonen	18,417	15–25–11	41	Recap

February: 3–6–1 (home: 1–4–1; away: 2–2–0)
#	Date	Visitor	Score	Home	OT	Decision	Attendance	Record	Pts	Recap
52	February 7	San Jose	4–3	Tampa Bay	OT	Kahkonen	19,092	16–25–11	43	Recap
53	February 9	San Jose	1–4	Florida		Kahkonen	15,183	16–26–11	43	Recap
54	February 12	San Jose	4–1	Washington		Kahkonen	18,573	17–26–11	45	Recap
55	February 14	Pittsburgh	3–1	San Jose		Dell	13,534	17–27–11	45	Recap
56	February 16	San Jose	1–2	Vegas		Kahkonen	17,544	17–28–11	45	Recap
57	February 18	Buffalo	4–2	San Jose		Kahkonen	17,562	17–29–11	45	Recap
58	February 20	Seattle	0–4	San Jose		Reimer	13,445	18–29–11	47	Recap
59	February 23	Nashville	6–2	San Jose		Reimer	11,320	18–30–11	47	Recap
60	February 25	Chicago	5–4	San Jose	SO	Kahkonen	17,562	18–30–12	48	Recap
61	February 28	Montreal	3–1	San Jose		Kahkonen	11,470	18–31–12	48	Recap

March: 3–8–3 (home: 2–4–2; away: 1–4–1)
#	Date	Visitor	Score	Home	OT	Decision	Attendance	Record	Pts	Recap
62	March 2	St. Louis	6–3	San Jose		Reimer	12,290	18–32–12	48	Recap
63	March 4	Washington	8–3	San Jose		Kahkonen	17,562	18–33–12	48	Recap
64	March 6	San Jose	3–2	Winnipeg	OT	Reimer	13,026	19–33–12	50	Recap
65	March 7	San Jose	0–6	Colorado		Kahkonen	18,092	19–34–12	50	Recap
66	March 9	San Jose	2–4	St. Louis		Kahkonen	18,096	19–35–12	50	Recap
67	March 11	Minnesota	5–2	San Jose		Reimer	17,562	19–36–12	50	Recap
68	March 14	Columbus	6–5	San Jose	OT	Kahkonen	10,127	19–36–13	51	Recap
69	March 16	Seattle	2–1	San Jose	OT	Reimer	11,720	19–36–14	52	Recap
70	March 18	NY Islanders	4–1	San Jose		Kahkonen	16,880	19–37–14	52	Recap
71	March 20	San Jose	4–5	Edmonton	OT	Reimer	18,347	19–37–15	53	Recap
72	March 23	San Jose	2–7	Vancouver		Reimer	18,919	19–38–15	53	Recap
73	March 25	San Jose	3–5	Calgary		Kahkonen	18,153	19–39–15	53	Recap
74	March 28	Winnipeg	0–3	San Jose		Reimer	10,387	20–39–15	55	Recap
75	March 30	Vegas	3–4	San Jose	OT	Reimer	15,232	21–39–15	57	Recap

April: 1–5–1 (home: 0–2–1; away: 1–3–0)
#	Date	Visitor	Score	Home	OT	Decision	Attendance	Record	Pts	Recap
76	April 1	San Jose	7–2	Arizona		Kahkonen	4,600	22–39–15	59	Recap
77	April 4	Colorado	4–3	San Jose	OT	Kahkonen	11,067	22–39–16	60	Recap
78	April 6	Colorado	6–2	San Jose		Kahkonen	12,772	22–40–16	60	Recap
79	April 8	Edmonton	6–1	San Jose		Reimer	17,562	22–41–16	60	Recap
80	April 10	San Jose	2–6	Winnipeg		Reimer	13,428	22–42–16	60	Recap
81	April 12	San Jose	1–3	Calgary		Kahkonen	17,211	22–43–16	60	Recap
82	April 13	San Jose	2–5	Edmonton		Reimer	18,347	22–44–16	60	Recap

Legend: Win (2 points) Loss (0 points) Overtime/shootout loss (1 point)

== Player statistics ==
=== Skaters ===
Regular season
Player	GP	G	A	Pts	+/−	PIM
Erik Karlsson	82	25	76	101	−26	36
Logan Couture	82	27	40	67	−30	19
Tomas Hertl	79	22	41	63	−36	42
Timo Meier^{‡}	57	31	21	52	−19	25
Alexander Barabanov	68	15	32	47	−30	20
Kevin Labanc	72	15	18	33	−17	36
Nico Sturm	74	14	12	26	−13	23
Matt Benning	77	1	23	24	−18	26
Nick Bonino^{‡}	59	10	9	19	−6	28
Steven Lorentz	80	10	9	19	−18	16
Marc-Edouard Vlasic	78	1	17	18	−14	16
Noah Gregor	57	10	7	17	−9	32
Matt Nieto^{‡}	45	8	7	15	−22	8
Oskar Lindblom	73	6	9	15	−16	18
Evgeny Svechnikov	59	8	6	14	−6	26
Luke Kunin	31	5	8	13	−9	42
Jaycob Megna^{‡}	48	1	11	12	+6	21
Mario Ferraro	72	4	7	11	−31	24
Mikey Eyssimont^{†‡}	20	3	5	8	+1	34
Jacob Peterson^{†}	11	2	6	8	−10	4
Jonah Gadjovich	35	3	4	7	−3	57
Scott Harrington^{‡}	28	1	6	7	−7	8
Jacob MacDonald^{†}	25	1	5	6	−11	12
Martin Kaut^{†}	9	3	2	5	−2	0
Nick Cicek	16	0	4	4	−7	15
William Eklund	8	2	1	3	−5	6
Andrew Agozzino	4	1	2	3	−1	0
Radim Simek	44	1	2	3	−13	29
Andreas Johnsson^{†}	11	0	3	3	−6	6
Fabian Zetterlund^{†}	22	0	3	3	−10	8
Danil Gushchin	2	1	1	2	−1	0
Derrick Pouliot	8	0	2	2	−1	6
Thomas Bordeleau	8	0	2	2	−3	0
Henry Thrun	8	0	2	2	−3	0
Kyle Criscuolo	1	1	0	1	0	0
Nikolai Knyzhov	12	1	0	1	−13	8
Adam Raska	3	0	0	0	0	0
Jeffrey Viel	4	0	0	0	0	2
Tristen Robins	3	0	0	0	−1	0
C. J. Suess	1	0	0	0	−1	2

=== Goaltenders ===
Regular season
Player	GP	GS	TOI	W	L	OT	GA	GAA	SA	SV%	SO	G	A	PIM
James Reimer	43	41	2,358:00	12	21	8	147	3.48	1,335	.890	3	0	0	2
Kaapo Kahkonen	37	37	2,106:15	9	20	7	135	3.85	1,149	.883	1	0	0	0
Eetu Makiniemi	2	1	84:20	1	0	1	3	2.13	32	.906	0	0	0	0
Aaron Dell	4	3	199:17	0	3	0	9	2.71	103	.913	0	0	0	0

^{†}Denotes player spent time with another team before joining the Sharks. Stats reflect time with the Sharks only.
^{‡}Denotes player was traded mid-season. Stats reflect time with the Sharks only.

== Transactions ==
The Sharks have been involved in the following transactions during the 2022–23 season.

Key:

† Contract is entry-level.

‡ Contract initially takes effect in the 2023–24 season.

=== Trades ===
Date	Details		Ref
July 7, 2022	To Arizona Coyotes 1st-round pick in 2022	To San Jose Sharks CAR 1st-round pick in 2022; 2nd-round pick in 2022; NYI 2nd-round pick in 2022	
July 8, 2022	To Nashville Predators John Leonard; 3rd-round pick in 2023	To San Jose Sharks Luke Kunin	
July 8, 2022	To Columbus Blue Jackets BUF 5th-round pick in 2022	To San Jose Sharks 5th-round pick in 2023	
July 8, 2022	To Arizona Coyotes 7th-round pick in 2022	To San Jose Sharks VAN 7th-round pick in 2023	
July 13, 2022	To Carolina Hurricanes Brent Burns^{1} Lane Pederson	To San Jose Sharks Steven Lorentz; Eetu Makiniemi; Conditional^{2} 3rd-round pick in 2023	
August 29, 2022	To Vegas Golden Knights Adin Hill	To San Jose Sharks 4th-round pick in 2024	
January 18, 2023	To Detroit Red Wings Jasper Weatherby	To San Jose Sharks Kyle Criscuolo	
January 25, 2023	To Colorado Avalanche Ryan Merkley; Matt Nieto	To San Jose Sharks Martin Kaut; Jacob MacDonald	
February 5, 2023	To Seattle Kraken Jaycob Megna	To San Jose Sharks 4th-round pick in 2023	
February 26, 2023	To New Jersey Devils Zachary Emond; Scott Harrington; Santeri Hatakka; Timur Ibragimov; Timo Meier^{3} 5th-round pick in 2024	To San Jose Sharks Andreas Johnsson; Shakir Mukhamadullin; Nikita Okhotiuk; Fabian Zetterlund; 1st-round pick in 2023; 2nd-round pick in 2024; 7th-round pick in 2024	
February 28, 2023	To Anaheim Ducks 3rd-round pick in 2024	To San Jose Sharks Henry Thrun	
March 1, 2023	To Tampa Bay Lightning Mikey Eyssimont	To San Jose Sharks Vladislav Namestnikov^{3}	
March 3, 2023	To Pittsburgh Penguins Nick Bonino	To San Jose Sharks Arvid Henriksson; Conditional 5th-round pick in 2024; PIT 7th-round pick in 2023	
March 3, 2023	To Montreal Canadiens Tony Sund; SJS 5th-round pick in 2024	To San Jose Sharks Arvid Henriksson; Conditional 5th-round pick in 2024; PIT 7th-round pick in 2023	
March 3, 2023	To Winnipeg Jets Vladislav Namestnikov	To San Jose Sharks 4th-round pick in 2025	
March 3, 2023	To Dallas Stars Scott Reedy	To San Jose Sharks Jacob Peterson	
June 27, 2023	To Anaheim Ducks Andrew Agozzino	To San Jose Sharks Andrej Sustr	
June 27, 2023	To New Jersey Devils 6th-round pick in 2023	To San Jose Sharks Mackenzie Blackwood	

Notes:

1. San Jose retains 34% of Burns' remaining contract.
2. San Jose will receive the lower of either Carolina's or Philadelphia's 3rd-round pick in 2023.
3. San Jose retains 50% of Meier's remaining contract in 2023.
4. Tampa Bay retains 50% of Namestnikov's remaining contract in 2023.

=== Players acquired ===
Date	Player	Former team	Term	Via	Ref
July 13, 2022	Andrew Agozzino	Ottawa Senators	2-year	Free agency	
July 13, 2022	Matt Benning	Nashville Predators	4-year	Free agency	
July 13, 2022	Aaron Dell	Buffalo Sabres	1-year	Free agency	
July 13, 2022	Oskar Lindblom	Philadelphia Flyers	2-year	Free agency	
July 13, 2022	Markus Nutivaara	Florida Panthers	1-year	Free agency	
July 13, 2022	Nico Sturm	Colorado Avalanche	3-year	Free agency	
July 13, 2022	C. J. Suess	Winnipeg Jets	1-year	Free agency	
September 3, 2022	Evgeny Svechnikov	Winnipeg Jets	1-year	Free agency	
September 30, 2022	Scott Harrington	Columbus Blue Jackets	1-year	Free agency	
January 6, 2023	Mikey Eyssimont	Winnipeg Jets		Waivers	
March 2, 2023	Derrick Pouliot	San Jose Barracuda (AHL)	1-year	Free agency	
May 3, 2023	Valtteri Pulli	TPS (Liiga)	2-year†‡	Free agency	
May 3, 2023	Georgi Romanov	Avtomobilist Yekaterinburg (KHL)	2-year†‡	Free agency	

=== Players lost ===
Date	Player	New team	Term	Via	Ref
July 13, 2022	Anthony Bitetto	Florida Panthers	1-year	Free agency	
July 13, 2022	Nicolas Meloche	Calgary Flames	1-year	Free agency	
July 13, 2022	Alex Stalock	Chicago Blackhawks	1-year	Free agency	
July 14, 2022	Rudolfs Balcers	Florida Panthers	1-year	Free agency	
July 14, 2022	Zach Sawchenko	Carolina Hurricanes	1-year	Free agency	
July 25, 2022	Ryan Dzingel	Carolina Hurricanes	1-year	Free agency	
July 26, 2022	Sasha Chmelevski	Salavat Yulaev Ufa (KHL)	1-year	Free agency	
July 27, 2022	Antoine Morand	Augsburger Panther (DEL)	N/A	Free agency	
August 31, 2022	Jonathan Dahlen	Timrå IK (SHL)	5-year	Free agency	
September 6, 2022	Jayden Halbgewachs	Växjö Lakers (SHL)	1-year	Free agency	
September 12, 2022	Jake McGrew	AIK IF (HockeyAllsvenskan)	1-year	Free agency	
May 18, 2023	Max Veronneau	Leksands IF (SHL)	1-year‡	Free agency	

=== Signings ===
Date	Player	Term	Ref
July 18, 2022	Kaapo Kahkonen	2-year	
July 18, 2022	Luke Kunin	2-year	
July 22, 2022	Steven Lorentz	2-year	
August 4, 2022	Mario Ferraro	4-year	
August 22, 2022	Noah Gregor	1-year	
August 29, 2022	Jonah Gadjovich	1-year	
March 25, 2023	Henry Thrun	2-year†	
March 29, 2023	Nikolai Knyzhov	2-year‡	
April 10, 2023	Magnus Chrona	2-year†‡	
April 14, 2023	Ethan Cardwell	3-year†‡	
April 14, 2023	Artem Guryev	3-year†‡	
June 12, 2023	Filip Bystedt	3-year†‡	

== Draft picks ==
Below are the San Jose Sharks' selections at the 2022 NHL entry draft, which was held on July 7 and 8, 2022 in Montreal, Quebec, Canada.

Round	#	Player	Pos	Nationality	College/Junior/Club (League)
1	27^{2}	Filip Bystedt	C	Sweden	Linköping HC (J20 Nationell)
2	34^{3}	Cameron Lund	C	USA	Green Bay Gamblers (USHL)
2	45^{5}	Mattias Havelid	D	Sweden	Linköping HC (J20 Nationell)
3	76	Michael Fisher	D	USA	St. Mark's School (USHS-Prep)
4	108	Mason Beaupit	G	Canada	Spokane Chiefs (WHL)
5	140^{2}	Jake Furlong	D	Canada	Halifax Mooseheads (QMJHL)
6	172	Joey Muldowney	RW	USA	Nichols School (USHS-Prep)
7	195^{7}	Eli Barnett	D	Canada	Victoria Grizzlies (BCHL)
7	217^{9}	Reese Laubach	C	USA	Northstar Christian Academy (U18 AAA)

Notes:

1. The San Jose Sharks' first-round pick went to the Arizona Coyotes as the result of a trade on July 7, 2022, that sent Carolina's first-round-pick in 2022 (27th overall), a second-round pick in 2022 (34th overall) and the Islanders' second-round pick in 2022 (45th overall) to San Jose in exchange for this pick.
2. The Carolina Hurricanes' first-round pick went to the San Jose Sharks as the result of a trade on July 7, 2022, that sent a first-round pick in 2022 (11th overall) to Arizona in exchange for a second-round pick in 2022 (34th overall), the Islanders' second-round pick in 2022 (45th overall) and this pick.
3. The Arizona Coyotes' second-round pick went to the San Jose Sharks as the result of a trade on July 7, 2022, that sent a first-round pick in 2022 (11th overall) to Arizona in exchange for Carolina's first-round pick in 2022 (27th overall), the Islanders' second-round pick in 2022 (45th overall) and this pick.
4. The San Jose Sharks' second-round pick went to the Arizona Coyotes as the result of a trade on July 17, 2021, that sent Adin Hill and a seventh-round pick in 2022 to San Jose in exchange for Josef Korenar and this pick.
5. The New York Islanders' second-round pick went to the San Jose Sharks as the result of a trade on July 7, 2022, that sent a first-round pick in 2022 (11th overall) to Arizona in exchange for Carolina's first-round pick in 2022 (27th overall), a second-round pick in 2022 (34th overall) and this pick.
6. The San Jose Sharks' fifth-round pick was re-acquired as the result of a trade on March 21, 2022, that sent Jake Middleton to Minnesota in exchange for Kaapo Kahkonen and this pick.
7. The Arizona Coyotes' seventh-round pick went to the San Jose Sharks as the result of a trade on July 17, 2021, that sent Josef Korenar and a second-round pick in 2022 to Arizona in exchange for Adin Hill and this pick.
8. The San Jose Sharks' seventh-round pick went to the Arizona Coyotes as the result of a trade on July 8, 2022, that sent Vancouver's seventh-round pick in 2023 to San Jose in exchange for this pick.
9. The Minnesota Wild's seventh-round pick went to the San Jose Sharks as the result of a trade on October 5, 2020, that sent a fifth-round pick in 2022 to Minnesota in exchange for Devan Dubnyk and this pick.

== Awards ==
Regular season
Player	Award	Awarded
Erik Karlsson	Third star of the week Second star of the week All-Star; Second star of the week James Norris Memorial Trophy; NHL All-Star team	November 1–7, 2022; December 26, 2022 – January 1, 2023; January 5, 2023; February 6–12, 2023; June 26, 2023; June 26, 2023
