= 2022–23 Buffalo Sabres season =

National Hockey League season

2022–23 Buffalo Sabres
- Division: 5th Atlantic
- Conference: 10th Eastern
- 2022–23 record: 42–33–7
- Home record: 17–20–4
- Road record: 25–13–3
- Goals for: 296
- Goals against: 300

Team information
- General manager: Kevyn Adams
- Coach: Don Granato
- Captain: Kyle Okposo
- Alternate captains: Rasmus Dahlin; Zemgus Girgensons
- Arena: KeyBank Center
- Average attendance: 15,567
- Minor league affiliates: Rochester Americans (AHL); Cincinnati Cyclones (ECHL)

Team leaders
- Goals: Tage Thompson (47)
- Assists: Rasmus Dahlin (58)
- Points: Tage Thompson (94)
- Penalty minutes: Rasmus Dahlin (92)
- Plus/minus: Jeff Skinner (+15)
- Wins: Ukko-Pekka Luukkonen (17)
- Goals against average: Devon Levi (2.94)

The 2022–23 Buffalo Sabres season was the 53rd season for the National Hockey League (NHL) franchise that was established on May 22, 1970. This was the first season since the inaugural season in 1970–71 in which Rick Jeanneret did not call games. With a win against the Detroit Red Wings on April 5, they clinched their first winning season since 2010–11. Despite this, the Sabres missed the playoffs for the 12th consecutive season, finishing one point short of qualifying for a playoff spot as the second wild-card. The Sabres continued the longest playoffs drought in NHL history, as they were eliminated from playoff contention after a loss to the New Jersey Devils on April 11, 2023.

== Standings ==
=== Divisional standings ===
Atlantic Division
Pos	Team	GP	W	L	OTL	RW	GF	GA	GD	Pts
1	p – Boston Bruins	82	65	12	5	54	305	177	+128	135
2	x – Toronto Maple Leafs	82	50	21	11	42	279	222	+57	111
3	x – Tampa Bay Lightning	82	46	30	6	38	283	254	+29	98
4	x – Florida Panthers	82	42	32	8	36	290	273	+17	92
5	Buffalo Sabres	82	42	33	7	30	296	300	−4	91
6	Ottawa Senators	82	39	35	8	31	261	271	−10	86
7	Detroit Red Wings	82	35	37	10	28	240	279	−39	80
8	Montreal Canadiens	82	31	45	6	21	232	307	−75	68

Source: National Hockey League
Rules for classification: 1) Fewer number of games played (GP, only during regular season); 2) Greater number of regulation wins (RW); 3) Greater number of wins in regulation and overtime, excluding shootout wins (ROW); 4) Greater number of total wins, including shootouts (W); 5) Greater number of points earned in head-to-head play; if teams played an uneven number of head-to-head games, the result of the first game on the home ice of the team with the extra home game is discarded; 6) Greater goal differential (GD); 7) Greater number of goals scored (GF)
p – Clinched Presidents' Trophy; x – Clinched playoff spot

=== Eastern Conference ===
Eastern Conference Wild Card
Pos	Div	Team	GP	W	L	OTL	RW	GF	GA	GD	Pts
1	ME	x – New York Islanders	82	42	31	9	36	243	222	+21	93
2	AT	x – Florida Panthers	82	42	32	8	36	290	273	+17	92
3	ME	Pittsburgh Penguins	82	40	31	11	31	262	264	−2	91
4	AT	Buffalo Sabres	82	42	33	7	30	296	300	−4	91
5	AT	Ottawa Senators	82	39	35	8	31	261	271	−10	86
6	AT	Detroit Red Wings	82	35	37	10	28	240	279	−39	80
7	ME	Washington Capitals	82	35	37	10	27	255	265	−10	80
8	ME	Philadelphia Flyers	82	31	38	13	26	222	277	−55	75
9	AT	Montreal Canadiens	82	31	45	6	21	232	307	−75	68
10	ME	Columbus Blue Jackets	82	25	48	9	15	214	330	−116	59

Source: National Hockey League
Rules for classification: 1) Fewer number of games played (GP, only during regular season); 2) Greater number of regulation wins (RW); 3) Greater number of wins in regulation and overtime, excluding shootout wins (ROW); 4) Greater number of total wins, including shootouts (W); 5) Greater number of points earned in head-to-head play; if teams played an uneven number of head-to-head games, the result of the first game on the home ice of the team with the extra home game is discarded; 6) Greater goal differential (GD); 7) Greater number of goals scored (GF)
x – Clinched playoff spot

== Schedule and results ==
=== Regular season ===
The regular season schedule was published on July 6, 2022.

2022–23 game log

October: 6–3–0 (home: 3–2–0; road: 3–1–0)
#	Date	Visitor	Score	Home	OT	Decision	Attendance	Record	Pts	Recap
1	October 13	Ottawa	1–4	Buffalo		Anderson	15,364	1–0–0	2
2	October 15	Florida	4–3	Buffalo		Comrie	11,481	1–1–0	2
3	October 18	Buffalo	4–2	Edmonton		Comrie	16,121	2–1–0	4
4	October 20	Buffalo	6–3	Calgary		Comrie	17,080	3–1–0	6
5	October 22	Buffalo	5–1	Vancouver		Anderson	18,809	4–1–0	8
6	October 25	Buffalo	1–5	Seattle		Comrie	17,151	4–2–0	8
7	October 27	Montreal	3–2	Buffalo		Comrie	12,735	4–3–0	8
8	October 29	Chicago	3–4	Buffalo	OT	Anderson	14,547	5–3–0	10
9	October 31	Detroit	3–8	Buffalo		Comrie	9,673	6–3–0	12

November: 4–9–1 (home: 2–5–1; road: 2–4–0)
#	Date	Visitor	Score	Home	OT	Decision	Attendance	Record	Pts	Recap
10	November 2	Pittsburgh	3–6	Buffalo		Comrie	12,201	7–3–0	14
11	November 4	Buffalo	3–5	Carolina		Anderson	18,727	7–4–0	14
12	November 5	Buffalo	3–5	Tampa Bay		Comrie	19,092	7–5–0	14
13	November 8	Arizona	4–1	Buffalo		Comrie	10,296	7–6–0	14
14	November 10	Vegas	7–4	Buffalo		Comrie	15,757	7–7–0	14
15	November 12	Boston	3–1	Buffalo		Anderson	19,070	7–8–0	14
16	November 15	Vancouver	5–4	Buffalo		Anderson	11,130	7–9–0	14
17	November 16	Buffalo	1–4	Ottawa		Comrie	13,558	7–10–0	14
18	November 19	Buffalo	2–5	Toronto		Luukkonen	18,645	7–11–0	14
19	November 22	Buffalo	7–2	Montreal		Anderson	20,984	8–11–0	16
20	November 23	St. Louis	2–6	Buffalo		Luukkonen	17,302	9–11–0	18
21	November 25	New Jersey	3–1	Buffalo		Anderson	16,727	9–12–0	18
22	November 28	Tampa Bay	6–5	Buffalo	OT	Luukkonen	11,766	9–12–1	19
23	November 30	Buffalo	5–4	Detroit	SO	Anderson	17,117	10–12–1	21

December: 8–2–1 (home: 3–1–1; road: 5–1–0)
#	Date	Visitor	Score	Home	OT	Decision	Attendance	Record	Pts	Recap
24	December 1	Colorado	6–4	Buffalo		Luukkonen	12,805	10–13–1	21
25	December 4	San Jose	3–6	Buffalo		Luukkonen	13,655	11–13–1	23
26	December 7	Buffalo	9–4	Columbus		Luukkonen	15,659	12–13–1	25
27	December 9	Pittsburgh	4–3	Buffalo	OT	Anderson	17,205	12–13–2	26
28	December 10	Buffalo	1–3	Pittsburgh		Luukkonen	18,414	12–14–2	26
29	December 13	Los Angeles	0–6	Buffalo		Anderson	12,873	13–14–2	28
30	December 15	Buffalo	4–2	Colorado		Luukkonen	18,103	14–14–2	30
31	December 17	Buffalo	5–2	Arizona		Anderson	4,600	15–14–2	32
32	December 19	Buffalo	3–2	Vegas		Luukkonen	17,808	16–14–2	34
—	December 23	Tampa Bay		Buffalo	Postponed due to winter storm. Moved to March 4.
—	December 27	Buffalo		Columbus	Postponed due to winter storm. Moved to April 14.
33	December 29	Detroit	3–6	Buffalo		Luukkonen	19,070	17–14–2	36
34	December 31	Buffalo	4–3	Boston	OT	Luukkonen	17,850	18–14–2	38

January: 8–5–2 (home: 3–4–0; road: 5–1–2)
#	Date	Visitor	Score	Home	OT	Decision	Attendance	Record	Pts	Recap
35	January 1	Buffalo	1–3	Ottawa		Anderson	18,231	18–15–2	38
36	January 3	Buffalo	5–4	Washington	OT	Luukkonen	18,573	19–15–2	40
37	January 7	Minnesota	5–6	Buffalo	OT	Luukkonen	19,070	20–15–2	42
38	January 9	Philadelphia	4–0	Buffalo		Anderson	11,271	20–16–2	42
39	January 10	Seattle	4–3	Buffalo		Comrie	13,219	20–17–2	42
40	January 12	Winnipeg	4–2	Buffalo		Luukkonen	15,208	20–18–2	42
41	January 14	Buffalo	5–3	Nashville		Luukkonen	17,761	21–18–2	44
42	January 16	Florida	4–1	Buffalo		Luukkonen	15,251	21–19–2	44
43	January 17	Buffalo	3–4	Chicago	OT	Anderson	16,363	21–19–3	45
44	January 19	NY Islanders	2–3	Buffalo	OT	Luukkonen	19,070	22–19–3	47
45	January 21	Anaheim	3–6	Buffalo		Luukkonen	19,070	23–19–3	49
46	January 23	Buffalo	3–2	Dallas	OT	Anderson	18,134	24–19–3	51
47	January 24	Buffalo	5–3	St. Louis		Luukkonen	18,096	25–19–3	53
48	January 26	Buffalo	3–2	Winnipeg		Comrie	13,589	26–19–3	55
49	January 28	Buffalo	2–3	Minnesota	SO	Luukkonen	19,212	26–19–4	56

February: 5–5–0 (home: 1–4–0; road: 4–1–0)
#	Date	Visitor	Score	Home	OT	Decision	Attendance	Record	Pts	Recap
50	February 1	Carolina	5–1	Buffalo		Luukkonen	14,166	26–20–4	56
51	February 11	Calgary	7–2	Buffalo		Luukkonen	18,356	26–21–4	56
52	February 13	Buffalo	2–5	Los Angeles		Anderson	17,025	26–22–4	56
53	February 15	Buffalo	7–3	Anaheim		Comrie	15,165	27–22–4	58
54	February 18	Buffalo	4–2	San Jose		Luukkonen	17,562	28–22–4	60
55	February 21	Toronto	6–3	Buffalo		Luukkonen	18,641	28–23–4	60
56	February 23	Buffalo	6–5	Tampa Bay	OT	Comrie	19,092	29–23–4	62
57	February 24	Buffalo	3–1	Florida		Anderson	18,075	30–23–4	64
58	February 26	Washington	4–7	Buffalo		Luukkonen	19,070	31–23–4	66
59	February 28	Columbus	5–3	Buffalo		Anderson	13,661	31–24–4	66

March: 5–7–3 (home: 3–4–2; road: 2–3–1)
#	Date	Visitor	Score	Home	OT	Decision	Attendance	Record	Pts	Recap
60	March 2	Buffalo	1–7	Boston		Luukkonen	17,850	31–25–4	66
61	March 4	Tampa Bay	3–5	Buffalo		Comrie	19,070	32–25–4	68
62	March 6	Edmonton	3–2	Buffalo		Anderson	17,634	32–26–4	68
63	March 7	Buffalo	2–3	NY Islanders		Luukkonen	17,255	32–27–4	68
64	March 9	Dallas	10–4	Buffalo		Comrie	14,174	32–28–4	68
65	March 11	NY Rangers	2–1	Buffalo	OT	Luukkonen	19,070	32–28–5	69
66	March 13	Buffalo	4–3	Toronto		Anderson	18,688	33–28–5	71
67	March 15	Buffalo	4–5	Washington	SO	Luukkonen	18,573	33–28–6	72
68	March 17	Buffalo	2–5	Philadelphia		Anderson	18,051	33–29–6	72
69	March 19	Boston	7–0	Buffalo		Luukkonen	19,070	33–30–6	72
70	March 21	Nashville	7–3	Buffalo		Anderson	13,043	33–31–6	72
71	March 24	New Jersey	4–5	Buffalo		Luukkonen	17,101	34–31–6	74
72	March 25	Buffalo	2–0	NY Islanders		Comrie	17,255	35–31–6	76
73	March 27	Montreal	4–3	Buffalo	SO	Comrie	16,435	35–31–7	77
74	March 31	NY Rangers	2–3	Buffalo	OT	Levi	18,009	36–31–7	79

April: 6–2–0 (home: 2–0–0; road: 4–2–0)
#	Date	Visitor	Score	Home	OT	Decision	Attendance	Record	Pts	Recap
75	April 1	Buffalo	6–3	Philadelphia		Luukkonen	19,404	37–31–7	81
76	April 4	Buffalo	1–2	Florida		Levi	17,255	37–32–7	81
77	April 6	Buffalo	7–6	Detroit	SO	Levi	19,367	38–32–7	83
78	April 8	Carolina	3–4	Buffalo		Levi	18,199	39–32–7	85
79	April 10	Buffalo	3–2	NY Rangers	SO	Levi	18,006	40–32–7	87
80	April 11	Buffalo	2–6	New Jersey		Levi	16,514	40–33–7	87
81	April 13	Ottawa	3–4	Buffalo	OT	Anderson	16,739	41–33–7	89
82	April 14	Buffalo	5–2	Columbus		Levi	18,786	42–33–7	91

Legend: Win (2 points) Loss (0 points) Overtime/shootout loss (1 point)

== Player statistics ==
=== Skaters ===
Regular season
Player	GP	G	A	Pts	+/−	PIM
Tage Thompson	78	47	47	94	+4	39
Jeff Skinner	79	35	47	82	+15	39
Alex Tuch	74	36	43	79	+14	20
Rasmus Dahlin	78	15	58	73	+12	92
Dylan Cozens	81	31	37	68	−3	41
Casey Mittelstadt	82	15	44	59	−8	22
Victor Olofsson	75	28	12	40	−23	4
Jack Quinn	75	14	23	37	−7	15
Owen Power	79	4	31	35	+10	24
JJ Peterka	77	12	20	32	−15	26
Kyle Okposo	75	11	17	28	−7	34
Peyton Krebs	74	9	17	26	−8	50
Tyson Jost^{†}	59	7	15	22	−9	23
Zemgus Girgensons	80	10	8	18	−5	14
Ilya Lyubushkin	68	2	12	14	−2	38
Henri Jokiharju	60	3	10	13	−12	30
Vinnie Hinostroza	26	2	9	11	−1	6
Mattias Samuelsson	55	2	8	10	+14	20
Jacob Bryson	59	1	8	9	−24	8
Rasmus Asplund^{‡}	27	2	6	8	0	0
Jordan Greenway^{†}	17	4	0	4	−3	0
Kale Clague	33	0	4	4	−3	24
Lawrence Pilut	17	1	2	3	−4	0
Riley Stillman^{†}	18	1	2	3	+1	13
Casey Fitzgerald^{‡}	23	0	3	3	−1	4
Lukas Rousek	2	1	1	2	+1	0
Jeremy Davies	1	0	0	0	0	2
Anders Bjork^{‡}	1	0	0	0	0	0
Riley Sheahan	2	0	0	0	−2	4

=== Goaltenders ===
Regular season
Player	GP	GS	TOI	W	L	OT	GA	GAA	SA	SV%	SO	G	A	PIM
Ukko-Pekka Luukkonen	33	32	1,910:13	17	11	4	115	3.61	1,054	.892	0	0	1	2
Craig Anderson	26	24	1,392:52	11	11	2	76	3.06	823	.908	1	0	1	2
Eric Comrie	19	19	1,111:59	9	9	1	68	3.67	594	.886	1	0	1	2
Devon Levi	7	7	429:01	5	2	0	21	2.94	222	.905	0	0	0	0

^{†}Denotes player spent time with another team before joining the Sabres. Stats reflect time with the Sabres only.
^{‡}Denotes player was traded mid-season. Stats reflect time with the Sabres only.
Bold/italics denotes franchise record.

== Transactions ==
The Sabres have been involved in the following transactions during the 2022–23 season.

Key:

† Contract is entry-level.
‡ Contract initially takes effect in the 2023–24 season.

=== Trades ===
Date	Details		Ref
December 15, 2022	To Dallas Stars Oskari Laaksonen	To Buffalo Sabres Joseph Cecconi	
February 27, 2023	To Vancouver Canucks Josh Bloom	To Buffalo Sabres Riley Stillman	
March 1, 2023	To Los Angeles Kings Erik Portillo	To Buffalo Sabres 3rd-round pick in 2023	
March 2, 2023	To Chicago Blackhawks Anders Bjork	To Buffalo Sabres Future considerations	
March 3, 2023	To Anaheim Ducks Chase Priskie	To Buffalo Sabres Austin Strand	
March 3, 2023	To Minnesota Wild 2nd-round pick in 2023; 4th-round pick in 2024	To Buffalo Sabres Jordan Greenway	
March 3, 2023	To Nashville Predators Rasmus Asplund	To Buffalo Sabres 7th-round pick in 2025	

=== Players acquired ===
Date	Player	Former team	Term	Via	Ref
July 13, 2022	Kale Clague	Montreal Canadiens	1-year	Free agency	
July 13, 2022	Eric Comrie	Winnipeg Jets	2-year	Free agency	
July 13, 2022	Jeremy Davies	Nashville Predators	1-year	Free agency	
July 13, 2022	Ilya Lyubushkin	Toronto Maple Leafs	2-year	Free agency	
July 13, 2022	Chase Priskie	Florida Panthers	1-year	Free agency	
August 10, 2022	Riley Sheahan	Seattle Kraken	1-year	Free agency	
November 19, 2022	Tyson Jost	Minnesota Wild		Waivers	

=== Players lost ===
Date	Player	New team	Term	Via	Ref
July 13, 2022	Drake Caggiula	Pittsburgh Penguins	1-year	Free agency	
July 13, 2022	Aaron Dell	San Jose Sharks	1-year	Free agency	
July 13, 2022	Colin Miller	Dallas Stars	2-year	Free agency	
July 13, 2022	Ethan Prow	Rochester Americans (AHL)	2-year	Free agency	
July 13, 2022	Dustin Tokarski	Pittsburgh Penguins	1-year	Free agency	
July 14, 2022	Mark Jankowski	Nashville Predators	1-year	Free agency	
July 14, 2022	Mark Pysyk	Detroit Red Wings	1-year	Free agency	
July 15, 2022	John Hayden	Seattle Kraken	1-year	Free agency	
July 15, 2022	Michael Houser	Rochester Americans (AHL)	1-year	Free agency	
July 22, 2022	Will Butcher	Dallas Stars	1-year	Free agency	
July 22, 2022	Arttu Ruotsalainen	EHC Kloten (NL)	1-year	Free agency	
August 30, 2022	Brandon Davidson	Kunlun Red Star (KHL)	2-year	Free agency	
September 16, 2022	Ryan MacInnis	Amur Khabarovsk (KHL)	1-year	Free agency	
September 22, 2022	Jimmy Schuldt	Coachella Valley Firebirds (AHL)	1-year	Free agency	
October 14, 2022	Cody Eakin	SCL Tigers (NL)	1-year	Free agency	
November 28, 2022	Riley Sheahan			Contract termination	
December 1, 2022	Riley Sheahan	EHC Biel-Bienne (NL)	1-year	Free agency	
January 11, 2023	Casey Fitzgerald	Florida Panthers		Waivers	
June 6, 2023	Lawrence Pilut	Lausanne HC (NL)	2-year‡	Free agency	

=== Signings ===
Date	Player	Term	Ref
July 8, 2022	Brandon Biro	2-year	
July 10, 2022	Jacob Bryson	2-year	
July 12, 2022	Vinnie Hinostroza	2-year	
July 12, 2022	Malcolm Subban	1-year	
July 13, 2022	Victor Olofsson	2-year	
July 15, 2022	Jiri Kulich	3-year†	
July 15, 2022	Noah Ostlund	3-year†	
July 15, 2022	Lawrence Pilut	1-year	
July 15, 2022	Matthew Savoie	3-year†	
July 18, 2022	Brett Murray	1-year	
August 19, 2022	Tyson Kozak	3-year†	
August 30, 2022	Tage Thompson	7-year‡	
August 31, 2022	Ukko-Pekka Luukkonen	2-year	
October 12, 2022	Mattias Samuelsson	7-year‡	
February 7, 2023	Dylan Cozens	7-year‡	
March 17, 2023	Devon Levi	3-year†‡	
May 2, 2023	Viktor Neuchev	3-year†‡	
May 19, 2023	Nikita Novikov	3-year†‡	
May 24, 2023	Kyle Okposo	1-year‡	
May 25, 2023	Vsevolod Komarov	3-year†‡	
May 27, 2023	Ryan Johnson	2-year†‡	
June 20, 2023	Zemgus Girgensons	1-year‡	
June 20, 2023	Lukas Rousek	2-year‡	
June 23, 2023	Joseph Cecconi	1-year‡	
June 26, 2023	Jeremy Davies	1-year‡	

== Draft Picks ==
Below are the Buffalo Sabres' selections at the 2022 NHL entry draft, which was held on July 7 to 8, 2022, at Bell Centre in Montreal.

Round	#	Player	Pos.	Nationality	Team (League)
1	9	Matthew Savoie	C	Canada	Winnipeg Ice (WHL)
1	16	Noah Ostlund	C	Sweden	Djurgårdens IF (J20 Nationell)
1	28	Jiri Kulich	C	Czech Republic	HC Energie Karlovy Vary (ELH)
2	41	Topias Leinonen	G	Finland	JYP (U20 SM-sarja)
3	74	Viktor Neuchev	LW	Russia	Avto Yekaterinburg (MHL)
4	106	Mats Lindgren	D	Canada	Kamloops Blazers (WHL)
5	134	Vsevolod Komarov	D	Russia	Quebec Remparts (QMJHL)
6	170	Jake Richard	RW	USA	Muskegon Lumberjacks (USHL)
6	187	Gustav Karlsson	C	Sweden	Örebro HK (J20 Nationell)
7	202	Joel Ratkovic Berndtsson	RW	Sweden	Frölunda HC (J20 Nationell)
7	211	Linus Sjodin	C	Sweden	Rögle BK (SHL)
