= 2022–23 Seattle Kraken season =

National Hockey League season

2022–23 Seattle Kraken
- Division: 4th Pacific
- Conference: 7th Western
- 2022–23 record: 46–28–8
- Home record: 20–17–4
- Road record: 26–11–4
- Goals for: 289
- Goals against: 256

Team information
- General manager: Ron Francis
- Coach: Dave Hakstol
- Captain: Vacant
- Alternate captains: Jordan Eberle; Yanni Gourde; Adam Larsson; Jaden Schwartz
- Arena: Climate Pledge Arena
- Average attendance: 17,151
- Minor league affiliates: Coachella Valley Firebirds (AHL); Kansas City Mavericks (ECHL)

Team leaders
- Goals: Jared McCann (40)
- Assists: Vince Dunn (50)
- Points: Jared McCann (70)
- Penalty minutes: Yanni Gourde (76)
- Plus/minus: Vince Dunn (+28)
- Wins: Martin Jones (27)
- Goals against average: Philipp Grubauer (2.85)

The 2022–23 Seattle Kraken season was the second season for the National Hockey League (NHL) franchise. They played their home games at Climate Pledge Arena.

In January 2023, the Kraken became the first team in NHL history to win all seven games of a road trip. On April 6, the Kraken clinched a playoff berth for the first time in franchise history after a win over the Arizona Coyotes. On April 30, the Kraken won their inaugural playoff series in seven games, upsetting the defending champion Colorado Avalanche. In the Second Round, the Kraken lost to the Dallas Stars in seven games, dropping 3 of the last 4 games of the series after taking a 2–1 lead.

== Standings ==
=== Divisional standings ===
Pacific Division
Pos	Team	GP	W	L	OTL	RW	GF	GA	GD	Pts
1	z – Vegas Golden Knights	82	51	22	9	38	272	229	+43	111
2	x – Edmonton Oilers	82	50	23	9	45	325	260	+65	109
3	x – Los Angeles Kings	82	47	25	10	37	280	257	+23	104
4	x – Seattle Kraken	82	46	28	8	37	289	256	+33	100
5	Calgary Flames	82	38	27	17	31	260	252	+8	93
6	Vancouver Canucks	82	38	37	7	24	276	298	−22	83
7	San Jose Sharks	82	22	44	16	16	234	321	−87	60
8	Anaheim Ducks	82	23	47	12	13	209	338	−129	58

Source: National Hockey League
Rules for classification: 1) Fewer number of games played (GP, only during regular season); 2) Greater number of regulation wins (RW); 3) Greater number of wins in regulation and overtime, excluding shootout wins (ROW); 4) Greater number of total wins, including shootouts (W); 5) Greater number of points earned in head-to-head play; if teams played an uneven number of head-to-head games, the result of the first game on the home ice of the team with the extra home game is discarded; 6) Greater goal differential (GD); 7) Greater number of goals scored (GF)
x – Clinched playoff spot; z – Clinched conference

=== Conference standings ===
Western Conference Wild Card
Pos	Div	Team	GP	W	L	OTL	RW	GF	GA	GD	Pts
1	PA	x – Seattle Kraken	82	46	28	8	37	289	256	+33	100
2	CE	x – Winnipeg Jets	82	46	33	3	36	247	225	+22	95
3	PA	Calgary Flames	82	38	27	17	31	260	252	+8	93
4	CE	Nashville Predators	82	42	32	8	29	229	238	−9	92
5	PA	Vancouver Canucks	82	38	37	7	24	276	298	−22	83
6	CE	St. Louis Blues	82	37	38	7	27	263	301	−38	81
7	CE	Arizona Coyotes	82	28	40	14	20	228	299	−71	70
8	PA	San Jose Sharks	82	22	44	16	16	234	321	−87	60
9	CE	Chicago Blackhawks	82	26	49	7	18	204	301	−97	59
10	PA	Anaheim Ducks	82	23	47	12	13	209	338	−129	58

Source: National Hockey League
Rules for classification: 1) Fewer number of games played (GP, only during regular season); 2) Greater number of regulation wins (RW); 3) Greater number of wins in regulation and overtime, excluding shootout wins (ROW); 4) Greater number of total wins, including shootouts (W); 5) Greater number of points earned in head-to-head play; if teams played an uneven number of head-to-head games, the result of the first game on the home ice of the team with the extra home game is discarded; 6) Greater goal differential (GD); 7) Greater number of goals scored (GF)
x – Clinched playoff spot

== Schedule and results ==
=== Preseason ===
The preseason schedule was announced on July 5, 2022.

2022 preseason game log: 4–2–0 (home: 3–0–0; road: 1–2–0)
#	Date	Visitor	Score	Home	OT	Decision	Arena	Attendance	Record	Recap
1	September 26	Edmonton	0–3	Seattle		Jones	Climate Pledge Arena	17,151	1–0–0
2	September 27	Calgary	0–3	Seattle		Hellberg	Climate Pledge Arena	17,151	2–0–0
3	September 29	Seattle	4–3	Vancouver	OT	Jones	Rogers Arena	16,480	3–0–0
4	October 1	Vancouver	0–4	Seattle		Grubauer	Climate Pledge Arena	17,151	4–0–0
5	October 3	Seattle	1–4	Calgary		Jones	Scotiabank Saddledome	16,045	4–1–0
6	October 7	Seattle	3–5	Edmonton		Grubauer	Rogers Place	17,328	4–2–0

=== Regular season ===
The regular season schedule was released on July 7, 2022.

2022–23 game log

October: 4–4–2 (home: 2–3–1; road: 2–1–1)
#	Date	Visitor	Score	Home	OT	Decision	Attendance	Record	Pts	Recap
1	October 12	Seattle	4–5	Anaheim	OT	Grubauer	17,530	0–0–1	1
2	October 13	Seattle	4–1	Los Angeles		Jones	15,645	1–0–1	3
3	October 15	Vegas	5–2	Seattle		Jones	17,151	1–1–1	3
4	October 17	Carolina	5–1	Seattle		Grubauer	17,151	1–2–1	3
5	October 19	St. Louis	4–3	Seattle	OT	Jones	17,151	1–2–2	4
6	October 21	Seattle	3–2	Colorado		Jones	18,131	2–2–2	6
7	October 23	Seattle	4–5	Chicago		Jones	14,892	2–3–2	6
8	October 25	Buffalo	1–5	Seattle		Jones	17,151	3–3–2	8
9	October 27	Vancouver	5–4	Seattle		Jones	17,151	3–4–2	8
10	October 29	Pittsburgh	1–3	Seattle		Jones	17,151	4–4–2	10

November: 10–1–1 (home: 4–1–1; road: 6–0–0)
#	Date	Visitor	Score	Home	OT	Decision	Attendance	Record	Pts	Recap
11	November 1	Seattle	5–4	Calgary		Daccord	16,803	5–4–2	12
12	November 3	Seattle	4–0	Minnesota		Jones	17,221	6–4–2	14
13	November 5	Seattle	3–2	Pittsburgh		Jones	18,302	7–4–2	16
14	November 8	Nashville	1–5	Seattle		Jones	17,151	8–4–2	18
15	November 11	Minnesota	1–0	Seattle		Jones	17,151	8–5–2	18
16	November 13	Winnipeg	3–2	Seattle	OT	Jones	17,151	8–5–3	19
17	November 17	NY Rangers	2–3	Seattle	OT	Jones	17,151	9–5–3	21
18	November 19	Los Angeles	2–3	Seattle	OT	Jones	17,151	10–5–3	23
19	November 23	San Jose	5–8	Seattle		Jones	17,151	11–5–3	25
20	November 25	Seattle	4–2	Vegas		Grubauer	18,119	12–5–3	27
21	November 27	Seattle	5–4	Anaheim		Jones	14,324	13–5–3	29
22	November 29	Seattle	9–8	Los Angeles	OT	Jones	13,215	14–5–3	31

December: 4–7–1 (home: 3–4–0; road: 1–3–1)
#	Date	Visitor	Score	Home	OT	Decision	Attendance	Record	Pts	Recap
23	December 1	Washington	2–3	Seattle	OT	Grubauer	17,151	15–5–3	33
24	December 3	Florida	5–1	Seattle		Grubauer	17,151	15–6–3	33
25	December 6	Montreal	4–2	Seattle		Jones	17,151	15–7–3	33
26	December 9	Seattle	1–4	Washington		Grubauer	18,573	15–8–3	33
27	December 11	Seattle	5–2	Florida		Jones	15,625	16–8–3	35
28	December 13	Seattle	2–6	Tampa Bay		Grubauer	19,092	16–9–3	35
29	December 15	Seattle	2–3	Carolina		Grubauer	18,680	16–10–3	35
30	December 18	Winnipeg	2–3	Seattle		Grubauer	17,151	17–10–3	37
31	December 20	St. Louis	2–5	Seattle		Jones	17,151	18–10–3	39
32	December 22	Seattle	5–6	Vancouver	SO	Jones	18,794	18–10–4	40
33	December 28	Calgary	3–2	Seattle		Grubauer	17,151	18–11–4	40
34	December 30	Edmonton	7–2	Seattle		Grubauer	17,151	18–12–4	40

January: 11–3–1 (home: 4–2–1; road: 7–1–0)
#	Date	Visitor	Score	Home	OT	Decision	Attendance	Record	Pts	Recap
35	January 1	NY Islanders	1–4	Seattle		Jones	17,151	19–12–4	42
36	January 3	Seattle	5–2	Edmonton		Jones	18,297	20–12–4	44
37	January 5	Seattle	5–1	Toronto		Jones	18,624	21–12–4	46
38	January 7	Seattle	8–4	Ottawa		Jones	19,347	22–12–4	48
39	January 9	Seattle	4–0	Montreal		Jones	21,105	23–12–4	50
40	January 10	Seattle	4–3	Buffalo		Grubauer	13,219	24–12–4	52
41	January 12	Seattle	3–0	Boston		Jones	17,850	25–12–4	54
42	January 14	Seattle	8–5	Chicago		Jones	20,075	26–12–4	56
43	January 16	Tampa Bay	4–1	Seattle		Grubauer	17,151	26–13–4	56
44	January 17	Seattle	2–5	Edmonton		Jones	18,183	26–14–4	56
45	January 19	New Jersey	3–4	Seattle	OT	Jones	17,151	27–14–4	58
46	January 21	Colorado	2–1	Seattle	SO	Grubauer	17,151	27–14–5	59
47	January 25	Vancouver	1–6	Seattle		Jones	17,151	28–14–5	61
48	January 27	Calgary	5–2	Seattle		Jones	17,151	28–15–5	61
49	January 28	Columbus	1–3	Seattle		Grubauer	17,151	29–15–5	63

February: 4–6–1 (home: 2–2–0; road: 2–4–1)
#	Date	Visitor	Score	Home	OT	Decision	Attendance	Record	Pts	Recap
50	February 7	Seattle	0–4	NY Islanders		Jones	17,255	29–16–5	63
51	February 9	Seattle	1–3	New Jersey		Grubauer	15,697	29–17–5	63
52	February 10	Seattle	3–6	NY Rangers		Jones	18,006	29–18–5	63
53	February 12	Seattle	4–3	Philadelphia		Grubauer	18,129	30–18–5	65
54	February 14	Seattle	2–3	Winnipeg	SO	Grubauer	14,237	30–18–6	66
55	February 16	Philadelphia	2–6	Seattle		Grubauer	17,151	31–18–6	68
56	February 18	Detroit	2–4	Seattle		Grubauer	17,151	32–18–6	70
57	February 20	Seattle	0–4	San Jose		Jones	13,445	32–19–6	70
58	February 23	Boston	6–5	Seattle		Grubauer	17,151	32–20–6	70
59	February 26	Toronto	5–1	Seattle		Grubauer	17,151	32–21–6	70
60	February 28	Seattle	5–3	St. Louis		Jones	18,096	33–21–6	72

March: 8–4–2 (home: 2–3–1; road: 6–1–1)
#	Date	Visitor	Score	Home	OT	Decision	Attendance	Record	Pts	Recap
61	March 2	Seattle	5–4	Detroit	OT	Grubauer	18,289	34–21–6	74
62	March 3	Seattle	4–2	Columbus		Grubauer	18,712	35–21–6	76
63	March 5	Seattle	3–2	Colorado	OT	Grubauer	18,107	36–21–6	78
64	March 7	Anaheim	2–5	Seattle		Grubauer	17,151	37–21–6	80
65	March 9	Ottawa	5–4	Seattle		Grubauer	17,151	37–22–6	80
66	March 11	Dallas	4–3	Seattle	OT	Grubauer	17,151	37–22–7	81
67	March 13	Dallas	5–2	Seattle		Jones	17,151	37–23–7	81
68	March 16	Seattle	2–1	San Jose	OT	Grubauer	11,720	38–23–7	83
69	March 18	Edmonton	6–4	Seattle		Jones	17,171	38–24–7	83
70	March 21	Seattle	5–4	Dallas	OT	Daccord	18,532	39–24–7	85
71	March 23	Seattle	1–2	Nashville	SO	Daccord	17,436	39–24–8	86
72	March 25	Seattle	7–2	Nashville		Grubauer	17,335	40–24–8	88
73	March 27	Seattle	1–5	Minnesota		Grubauer	19,291	40–25–8	88
74	March 30	Anaheim	1–4	Seattle		Jones	17,151	41–25–8	90

April: 5–3–0 (home: 3–2–0; road: 2–1–0)
#	Date	Visitor	Score	Home	OT	Decision	Attendance	Record	Pts	Recap
75	April 1	Los Angeles	3–1	Seattle		Jones	17,151	41–26–8	90
76	April 3	Arizona	1–8	Seattle		Grubauer	17,151	42–26–8	92
77	April 4	Seattle	5–2	Vancouver		Jones	18,722	43–26–8	94
78	April 6	Arizona	2–4	Seattle		Grubauer	17,151	44–26–8	96
79	April 8	Chicago	3–7	Seattle		Jones	17,151	45–26–8	98
80	April 10	Seattle	4–1	Arizona		Grubauer	4,600	46–26–8	100
81	April 11	Seattle	1–4	Vegas		Daccord	18,377	46–27–8	100
82	April 13	Vegas	3–1	Seattle		Grubauer	17,151	46–28–8	100

Legend: Win (2 points) Loss (0 points) Overtime/shootout loss (1 point)

=== Playoffs ===
2023 Stanley Cup playoffs

Western Conference First Round vs. (C1) Colorado Avalanche: Seattle won 4–3
#	Date	Visitor	Score	Home	OT	Decision	Attendance	Series	Recap
1	April 18	Seattle	3–1	Colorado		Grubauer	18,138	1–0
2	April 20	Seattle	2–3	Colorado		Grubauer	18,141	1–1
3	April 22	Colorado	6–4	Seattle		Grubauer	17,151	1–2
4	April 24	Colorado	2–3	Seattle	OT	Grubauer	17,151	2–2
5	April 26	Seattle	3–2	Colorado		Grubauer	18,143	3–2
6	April 28	Colorado	4–1	Seattle		Grubauer	17,151	3–3
7	April 30	Seattle	2–1	Colorado		Grubauer	18,143	4–3

Western Conference Second Round vs. (C2) Dallas Stars: Dallas won 4–3
#	Date	Visitor	Score	Home	OT	Decision	Attendance	Series	Recap
1	May 2	Seattle	5–4	Dallas	OT	Grubauer	18,532	1–0
2	May 4	Seattle	2–4	Dallas		Grubauer	18,532	1–1
3	May 7	Dallas	2–7	Seattle		Grubauer	17,151	2–1
4	May 9	Dallas	6–3	Seattle		Grubauer	17,151	2–2
5	May 11	Seattle	2–5	Dallas		Grubauer	18,532	2–3
6	May 13	Dallas	3–6	Seattle		Grubauer	17,151	3–3
7	May 15	Seattle	1–2	Dallas		Grubauer	18,756	3–4

Legend: Win Loss

== Player statistics ==
=== Skaters ===
Regular season
Player	GP	G	A	Pts	+/−	PIM
Jared McCann	79	40	30	70	+18	14
Vince Dunn	81	14	50	64	+28	55
Jordan Eberle	82	20	43	63	+6	34
Matty Beniers	80	24	33	57	+14	2
Yanni Gourde	81	14	34	48	+23	76
Daniel Sprong	66	21	25	46	+13	14
Oliver Bjorkstrand	81	20	25	45	−1	16
Jaden Schwartz	71	21	19	40	–17	22
Andre Burakovsky	49	13	26	39	–9	14
Alexander Wennberg	82	13	25	38	–7	20
Brandon Tanev	82	16	19	35	+21	44
Justin Schultz	73	7	27	34	+4	40
Adam Larsson	82	8	25	33	+27	47
Morgan Geekie	69	9	19	28	+14	24
Eeli Tolvanen^{†}	48	16	11	27	+10	10
Ryan Donato	71	14	13	27	+16	46
Jamie Oleksiak	75	9	16	25	+13	72
Will Borgen	82	3	17	20	+11	47
Carson Soucy	78	3	13	16	+18	68
Jesper Froden	14	0	4	4	+4	6
Karson Kuhlman	14	1	2	3	+3	0
John Hayden	7	2	0	2	+2	7
Shane Wright	8	1	1	2	+4	2
Cale Fleury	12	0	1	1	0	2
Gustav Olofsson	3	0	0	0	+1	0
Jaycob Megna^{†}	6	0	0	0	–3	0

Playoffs
Player	GP	G	A	Pts	+/−	PIM
Yanni Gourde	14	4	9	13	+1	14
Jordan Eberle	14	6	5	11	+5	6
Jaden Schwartz	14	5	5	10	–2	2
Justin Schultz	14	3	7	10	+5	2
Oliver Bjorkstrand	14	4	4	8	–5	0
Eeli Tolvanen	14	3	5	8	–4	6
Matty Beniers	14	3	4	7	+6	4
Alexander Wennberg	14	2	5	7	–5	2
Vince Dunn	14	1	6	7	+2	22
Tye Kartye	10	3	2	5	+6	2
Morgan Geekie	13	2	2	4	0	12
Adam Larsson	14	2	2	4	+2	8
Brandon Tanev	14	1	3	4	0	4
Will Borgen	14	1	2	3	–6	8
Jared McCann	8	1	2	3	–1	6
Jamie Oleksiak	14	1	2	3	–6	8
Daniel Sprong	10	1	1	2	–3	0
Carson Soucy	14	1	1	2	+6	12
Ryan Donato	14	0	2	2	–2	12
Jesper Froden	1	0	0	0	–1	0

=== Goaltenders ===
Regular season
Player	GP	GS	TOI	W	L	OT	GA	GAA	SA	SV%	SO	G	A	PIM
Martin Jones	48	42	2,625:39	27	13	3	131	2.99	1,145	.887	3	0	0	0
Philipp Grubauer	39	36	2,065:37	17	14	4	98	2.85	930	.895	0	0	1	0
Joey Daccord	5	4	248:08	2	1	1	13	3.14	130	.900	0	0	0	0

Playoffs
Player	GP	GS	TOI	W	L	GA	GAA	SA	SV%	SO	G	A	PIM
Philipp Grubauer	14	14	822:42	7	7	41	2.99	422	.903	0	0	0	0
Martin Jones	1	0	18:15	0	0	0	0.00	2	1.000	0	0	0	0

^{†}Denotes player spent time with another team before joining the Kraken. Stats reflect time with the Kraken only.
^{‡}Denotes player was traded mid-season. Stats reflect time with the Kraken only.

== Transactions ==
The Kraken have been involved in the following transactions during the 2022–23 season.

Key:

† Contract is entry-level.
‡ Contract initially takes effect in the 2023–24 season.

=== Trades ===
Date	Details		Ref
July 8, 2022	To Boston Bruins WSH 4th-round pick in 2022; 5th-round pick in 2022	To Seattle Kraken CGY 3rd-round pick in 2022	
July 22, 2022	To Columbus Blue Jackets 3rd-round pick in 2023; WPG 4th-round pick in 2023	To Seattle Kraken Oliver Bjorkstrand	
February 5, 2023	To San Jose Sharks 4th-round pick in 2023	To Seattle Kraken Jaycob Megna	

=== Free agents acquired ===
Date	Player	Former team	Term	Ref
July 13, 2022	Andre Burakovsky	Colorado Avalanche	5-year	
July 13, 2022	Jesper Froden	Boston Bruins	1-year	
July 13, 2022	Magnus Hellberg	Detroit Red Wings	1-year	
July 13, 2022	Cameron Hughes	Boston Bruins	2-year	
July 13, 2022	Martin Jones	Philadelphia Flyers	1-year	
July 13, 2022	Austin Poganski	Winnipeg Jets	1-year	
July 13, 2022	Andrew Poturalski	Carolina Hurricanes	2-year	
July 13, 2022	Brogan Rafferty	Anaheim Ducks	1-year	
July 13, 2022	Justin Schultz	Washington Capitals	2-year	
July 15, 2022	John Hayden	Buffalo Sabres	1-year	
July 24, 2022	Michal Kempny	Washington Capitals	1-year	
October 27, 2022	Christopher Gibson	Coachella Valley Firebirds (AHL)	1-year	

=== Free agents lost ===
Date	Player	New team	Ref
July 13, 2022	Connor Carrick	Boston Bruins	
July 13, 2022	Haydn Fleury	Tampa Bay Lightning	
July 14, 2022	Antoine Bibeau	Ottawa Senators	
August 10, 2022	Derrick Pouliot	San Jose Barracuda (AHL)	
August 10, 2022	Riley Sheahan	Buffalo Sabres	
October 15, 2022	Victor Rask	HC Fribourg-Gottéron (NL)	
June 24, 2023	Jesper Froden	ZSC Lions (NL)	

=== Claimed via waivers ===
Date	Player	Former team	Ref
November 10, 2022	Magnus Hellberg	Ottawa Senators	
December 12, 2022	Eeli Tolvanen	Nashville Predators	

=== Lost via waivers ===
Date	Player	Former team	Ref
October 3, 2022	Magnus Hellberg	Ottawa Senators	
November 23, 2022	Magnus Hellberg	Detroit Red Wings	
December 13, 2022	Karson Kuhlman	Winnipeg Jets	

=== Other signings ===
Date	Player	Term	Ref
July 1, 2022	Gustav Olofsson	1-year	
July 11, 2022	Karson Kuhlman	1-year	
July 12, 2022	Alexander True	1-year	
July 13, 2022	Jacob Melanson	3-year†	
July 13, 2022	Ryan Winterton	3-year†	
July 13, 2022	Shane Wright	3-year†	
July 21, 2022	Kole Lind	1-year	
July 21, 2022	Carsen Twarynski	1-year	
July 24, 2022	Morgan Geekie	1-year	
July 27, 2022	Ryan Donato	1-year	
August 30, 2022	Cale Fleury	1-year	
October 3, 2022	Daniel Sprong	1-year	
March 21, 2023	Ville Ottavainen	3-year†‡	
April 11, 2023	David Goyette	3-year†‡	
April 11, 2023	Logan Morrison	3-year†‡	
April 30, 2023	Jagger Firkus	3-year†‡	
May 2, 2023	Ales Stezka	1-year†‡	
May 9, 2023	Nikke Kokko	3-year†	
May 11, 2023	Ty Nelson	3-year†	
June 11, 2023	Jani Nyman	3-year†‡	
June 27, 2023	Gustav Olofsson	2-year‡	
June 30, 2023	Joey Daccord	2-year	

=== Other players lost ===
Date	Player	Term	Ref
October 21, 2022	Michal Kempny	Contract terminated	

== Draft picks ==
Below are the Seattle Kraken's selections at the 2022 NHL entry draft, which were held on July 7 to 8, 2022. It was held at the Bell Centre in Montreal, Quebec.

Round	#	Player	Pos	Nationality	College/Junior/Club team (League)
1	4	Shane Wright	C	Canada	Kingston Frontenacs (OHL)
2	35	Jagger Firkus	RW	Canada	Moose Jaw Warriors (WHL)
2	49	Jani Nyman	RW	Finland	KOOVEE (Mestis)
2	58	Nikke Kokko	G	Finland	Oulun Kärpät (U20 SM-sarja)
2	61	David Goyette	C	Canada	Sudbury Wolves (OHL)
3	68	Ty Nelson	D	Canada	North Bay Battalion (OHL)
3	91	Ben MacDonald	C	United States	Noble & Greenough School (USHS-MA)
4	100	Tyson Jugnauth	D	Canada	West Kelowna Warriors (BCHL)
4	123	Tucker Robertson	C	Canada	Peterborough Petes (OHL)
6	164	Barrett Hall	C	United States	Gentry Academy (USHS-MN)
7	196	Kyle Jackson	LW	Canada	North Bay Battalion (OHL)
