= 2022–23 Detroit Red Wings season =

National Hockey League team season

2022–23 Detroit Red Wings
- Division: 7th Atlantic
- Conference: 12th Eastern
- 2022–23 record: 35–37–10
- Home record: 19–17–5
- Road record: 16–20–5
- Goals for: 240
- Goals against: 279

Team information
- General manager: Steve Yzerman
- Coach: Derek Lalonde
- Captain: Dylan Larkin
- Alternate captains: Rotating; Rotating
- Arena: Little Caesars Arena
- Average attendance: 18,819
- Minor league affiliates: Grand Rapids Griffins (AHL); Toledo Walleye (ECHL)

Team leaders
- Goals: Dylan Larkin (32)
- Assists: Dylan Larkin (47)
- Points: Dylan Larkin (79)
- Penalty minutes: David Perron (52)
- Plus/minus: Jake Walman (+10)
- Wins: Ville Husso (26)
- Goals against average: Ville Husso (3.11)

The 2022–23 Detroit Red Wings season was the 97th season for the National Hockey League (NHL) franchise that was established on September 25, 1926. It was the Red Wings' sixth season at Little Caesars Arena. This was the Red Wings' first season under new head coach Derek Lalonde.

The Red Wings were eliminated from playoff contention for the seventh consecutive season 1970–71 season and the 1976–77 season on April 6, 2023, after a 7–6 shootout loss to the Buffalo Sabres. They finished the season with a 35–37–10 record.

== Off-season ==
On June 30, 2022, Derek Lalonde was named head coach following the departure of Jeff Blashill.

== Standings ==
=== Divisional standings ===
Atlantic Division
| Pos | Team | GP | W | L | OTL | RW | GF | GA | GD | Pts |
|---|---|---|---|---|---|---|---|---|---|---|
| 1 | p – Boston Bruins | 82 | 65 | 12 | 5 | 54 | 305 | 177 | +128 | 135 |
| 2 | x – Toronto Maple Leafs | 82 | 50 | 21 | 11 | 42 | 279 | 222 | +57 | 111 |
| 3 | x – Tampa Bay Lightning | 82 | 46 | 30 | 6 | 38 | 283 | 254 | +29 | 98 |
| 4 | x – Florida Panthers | 82 | 42 | 32 | 8 | 36 | 290 | 273 | +17 | 92 |
| 5 | Buffalo Sabres | 82 | 42 | 33 | 7 | 30 | 296 | 300 | −4 | 91 |
| 6 | Ottawa Senators | 82 | 39 | 35 | 8 | 31 | 261 | 271 | −10 | 86 |
| 7 | Detroit Red Wings | 82 | 35 | 37 | 10 | 28 | 240 | 279 | −39 | 80 |
| 8 | Montreal Canadiens | 82 | 31 | 45 | 6 | 21 | 232 | 307 | −75 | 68 |

Source: National Hockey League
Rules for classification: 1) Fewer number of games played (GP, only during regular season); 2) Greater number of regulation wins (RW); 3) Greater number of wins in regulation and overtime, excluding shootout wins (ROW); 4) Greater number of total wins, including shootouts (W); 5) Greater number of points earned in head-to-head play; if teams played an uneven number of head-to-head games, the result of the first game on the home ice of the team with the extra home game is discarded; 6) Greater goal differential (GD); 7) Greater number of goals scored (GF)
p – Clinched Presidents' Trophy; x – Clinched playoff spot

=== Conference standings ===
Eastern Conference Wild Card
| Pos | Div | Team | GP | W | L | OTL | RW | GF | GA | GD | Pts |
|---|---|---|---|---|---|---|---|---|---|---|---|
| 1 | ME | x – New York Islanders | 82 | 42 | 31 | 9 | 36 | 243 | 222 | +21 | 93 |
| 2 | AT | x – Florida Panthers | 82 | 42 | 32 | 8 | 36 | 290 | 273 | +17 | 92 |
| 3 | ME | Pittsburgh Penguins | 82 | 40 | 31 | 11 | 31 | 262 | 264 | −2 | 91 |
| 4 | AT | Buffalo Sabres | 82 | 42 | 33 | 7 | 30 | 296 | 300 | −4 | 91 |
| 5 | AT | Ottawa Senators | 82 | 39 | 35 | 8 | 31 | 261 | 271 | −10 | 86 |
| 6 | AT | Detroit Red Wings | 82 | 35 | 37 | 10 | 28 | 240 | 279 | −39 | 80 |
| 7 | ME | Washington Capitals | 82 | 35 | 37 | 10 | 27 | 255 | 265 | −10 | 80 |
| 8 | ME | Philadelphia Flyers | 82 | 31 | 38 | 13 | 26 | 222 | 277 | −55 | 75 |
| 9 | AT | Montreal Canadiens | 82 | 31 | 45 | 6 | 21 | 232 | 307 | −75 | 68 |
| 10 | ME | Columbus Blue Jackets | 82 | 25 | 48 | 9 | 15 | 214 | 330 | −116 | 59 |

Source: National Hockey League
Rules for classification: 1) Fewer number of games played (GP, only during regular season); 2) Greater number of regulation wins (RW); 3) Greater number of wins in regulation and overtime, excluding shootout wins (ROW); 4) Greater number of total wins, including shootouts (W); 5) Greater number of points earned in head-to-head play; if teams played an uneven number of head-to-head games, the result of the first game on the home ice of the team with the extra home game is discarded; 6) Greater goal differential (GD); 7) Greater number of goals scored (GF)
x – Clinched playoff spot

== Schedule and results ==
=== Preseason ===
2022 preseason game log: 3–5–0 (Home: 1–3–0; Road: 2–2–0)
| # | Date | Visitor | Score | Home | OT | Decision | Attendance | Record | Recap |
|---|---|---|---|---|---|---|---|---|---|
| 1 | September 27 | Detroit | 6–2 | Pittsburgh | | Brattström | 13,020 | 1–0–0 |
| 2 | September 28 | Chicago | 4–2 | Detroit | | Olkinuora | 12,782 | 1–1–0 |
| 3 | September 30 | Washington | 2–0 | Detroit | | Brattström | 13,426 | 1–2–0 |
| 4 | October 1 | Detroit | 3–0 | Chicago | | Cossa | 15,735 | 2–2–0 |
| 5 | October 3 | Pittsburgh | 3–2 | Detroit | | Husso | — | 2–3–0 |
| 6 | October 5 | Detroit | 2–4 | Washington | | Husso | — | 2–4–0 |
| 7 | October 7 | Toronto | 2–4 | Detroit | | Nedeljkovic | — | 3–4–0 |
| 8 | October 8 | Detroit | 1–5 | Toronto | | Brattström | 18,347 | 3–5–0 |

=== Regular season ===
2022–23 game log 35–37–10 (Home: 19–17–5; Road: 16–20–5)

October: 4–3–2 (Home: 3–1–1; Road: 1–2–1)
| # | Date | Visitor | Score | Home | OT | Decision | Attendance | Record | Pts | Recap |
|---|---|---|---|---|---|---|---|---|---|---|
| 1 | October 14 | Montreal | 0–3 | Detroit | | Husso | 19,515 | 1–0–0 | 2 |
| 2 | October 15 | Detroit | 5–2 | New Jersey | | Nedeljkovic | 16,514 | 2–0–0 | 4 |
| 3 | October 17 | Los Angeles | 5–4 | Detroit | OT | Husso | 15,919 | 2–0–1 | 5 |
| 4 | October 21 | Detroit | 3–4 | Chicago | OT | Nedeljkovic | 18,753 | 2–0–2 | 6 |
| 5 | October 23 | Anaheim | 1–5 | Detroit | | Husso | 17,932 | 3–0–2 | 8 |
| 6 | October 25 | New Jersey | 6–2 | Detroit | | Nedeljkovic | 16,546 | 3–1–2 | 8 |
| 7 | October 27 | Detroit | 1–5 | Boston | | Husso | 17,850 | 3–2–2 | 8 |
| 8 | October 29 | Minnesota | 1–2 | Detroit | | Husso | 17,364 | 4–2–2 | 10 |
| 9 | October 31 | Detroit | 3–8 | Buffalo | | Nedeljkovic | 9,673 | 4–3–2 | 10 |

November: 7–3–3 (Home: 4–2–2; Road: 3–1–1)
| # | Date | Visitor | Score | Home | OT | Decision | Attendance | Record | Pts | Recap |
|---|---|---|---|---|---|---|---|---|---|---|
| 10 | November 3 | Washington | 1–3 | Detroit | | Husso | 18,527 | 5–3–2 | 12 |
| 11 | November 5 | NY Islanders | 0–3 | Detroit | | Husso | 19,515 | 6–3–2 | 14 |
| 12 | November 6 | Detroit | 3–2 | NY Rangers | OT | Nedeljkovic | 18,006 | 7–3–2 | 16 |
| 13 | November 8 | Montreal | 3–2 | Detroit | SO | Husso | 17,033 | 7–3–3 | 17 |
| 14 | November 10 | NY Rangers | 8–2 | Detroit | | Husso | 18,869 | 7–4–3 | 17 |
| 15 | November 12 | Detroit | 3–4 | Los Angeles | | Nedeljkovic | 18,230 | 7–5–3 | 17 |
| 16 | November 15 | Detroit | 2–3 | Anaheim | OT | Husso | 15,198 | 7–5–4 | 18 |
| 17 | November 17 | Detroit | 7–4 | San Jose | | Husso | 14,134 | 8–5–4 | 20 |
| 18 | November 19 | Detroit | 6–1 | Columbus | | Husso | 18,693 | 9–5–4 | 22 |
| 19 | November 23 | Nashville | 0–3 | Detroit | | Husso | 19,515 | 10–5–4 | 24 |
| 20 | November 25 | Arizona | 3–4 | Detroit | SO | Husso | 19,515 | 11–5–4 | 26 |
| 21 | November 28 | Toronto | 4–2 | Detroit | | Husso | 19,515 | 11–6–4 | 26 |
| 22 | November 30 | Buffalo | 5–4 | Detroit | SO | Nedeljkovic | 19,515 | 11–6–5 | 27 |

December: 5–6–2 (Home: 2–3–0; Road: 3–3–2)
| # | Date | Visitor | Score | Home | OT | Decision | Attendance | Record | Pts | Recap |
|---|---|---|---|---|---|---|---|---|---|---|
| 23 | December 3 | Vegas | 4–1 | Detroit | | Husso | 19,515 | 11–7–5 | 27 |
| 24 | December 4 | Detroit | 4–2 | Columbus | | Husso | 16,087 | 12–7–5 | 29 |
| 25 | December 6 | Detroit | 4–2 | Tampa Bay | | Husso | 19,092 | 13–7–5 | 31 |
| 26 | December 8 | Detroit | 1–5 | Florida | | Nedeljkovic | 14,961 | 13–8–5 | 31 |
| 27 | December 10 | Detroit | 2–3 | Dallas | OT | Husso | 18,532 | 13–8–6 | 32 |
| 28 | December 13 | Carolina | 1–0 | Detroit | | Husso | 19,515 | 13–9–6 | 32 |
| 29 | December 14 | Detroit | 1–4 | Minnesota | | Hellberg | 18,324 | 13–10–6 | 32 |
| 30 | December 17 | Ottawa | 6–3 | Detroit | | Husso | 19,515 | 13–11–6 | 32 |
| 31 | December 19 | Detroit | 3–4 | Washington | OT | Husso | 18,573 | 13–11–7 | 33 |
| 32 | December 21 | Tampa Bay | 4–7 | Detroit | | Husso | 19,515 | 14–11–7 | 35 |
| — | December 23 | Detroit | | Ottawa | Postponed due to winter storm. Rescheduled to February 27. |
| 33 | December 28 | Detroit | 5–4 | Pittsburgh | OT | Hellberg | 18,387 | 15–11–7 | 37 |
| 34 | December 29 | Detroit | 3–6 | Buffalo | | Hellberg | 19,070 | 15–12–7 | 37 |
| 35 | December 31 | Ottawa | 2–4 | Detroit | | Hellberg | 19,515 | 16–12–7 | 39 |

January: 5–7–1 (Home: 3–4–0; Road: 2–3–1)
| # | Date | Visitor | Score | Home | OT | Decision | Attendance | Record | Pts | Recap |
|---|---|---|---|---|---|---|---|---|---|---|
| 36 | January 4 | New Jersey | 5–1 | Detroit | | Husso | 19,515 | 16–13–7 | 39 |
| 37 | January 6 | Florida | 3–2 | Detroit | | Husso | 19,515 | 16–14–7 | 39 |
| 38 | January 7 | Detroit | 1–4 | Toronto | | Hellberg | 19,101 | 16–15–7 | 39 |
| 39 | January 10 | Winnipeg | 5–7 | Detroit | | Husso | 19,515 | 17–15–7 | 41 |
| 40 | January 12 | Toronto | 1–4 | Detroit | | Husso | 19,515 | 18–15–7 | 43 |
| 41 | January 14 | Columbus | 4–3 | Detroit | | Husso | 19,515 | 18–16–7 | 43 |
| 42 | January 16 | Detroit | 3–6 | Colorado | | Husso | 18,117 | 18–17–7 | 43 |
| 43 | January 17 | Detroit | 3–4 | Arizona | SO | Hellberg | 4,600 | 18–17–8 | 44 |
| 44 | January 19 | Detroit | 3–2 | Vegas | | Husso | 17,911 | 19–17–8 | 46 |
| 45 | January 21 | Philadelphia | 2–1 | Detroit | | Husso | 19,515 | 19–18–8 | 46 |
| 46 | January 24 | San Jose | 2–3 | Detroit | OT | Husso | 19,515 | 20–18–8 | 48 |
| 47 | January 26 | Detroit | 4–3 | Montreal | OT | Husso | 21,105 | 21–18–8 | 50 |
| 48 | January 27 | Detroit | 0–2 | NY Islanders | | Hellberg | 17,255 | 21–19–8 | 50 |

February: 7–5–0 (Home: 3–2–0; Road: 4–3–0)
| # | Date | Visitor | Score | Home | OT | Decision | Attendance | Record | Pts | Recap |
|---|---|---|---|---|---|---|---|---|---|---|
All-Star Break in Sunrise, Florida
| 49 | February 7 | Edmonton | 5–2 | Detroit | | Husso | 19,515 | 21–20–8 | 50 |
| 50 | February 9 | Calgary | 1–2 | Detroit | | Husso | 19,515 | 22–20–8 | 52 |
| 51 | February 11 | Vancouver | 2–5 | Detroit | | Husso | 19,515 | 23–20–8 | 54 |
| 52 | February 13 | Detroit | 6–1 | Vancouver | | Husso | 18,465 | 24–20–8 | 56 |
| 53 | February 15 | Detroit | 5–4 | Edmonton | SO | Husso | 17,627 | 25–20–8 | 58 |
| 54 | February 16 | Detroit | 5–2 | Calgary | | Hellberg | 17,713 | 26–20–8 | 60 |
| 55 | February 18 | Detroit | 2–4 | Seattle | | Husso | 17,151 | 26–21–8 | 60 |
| 56 | February 21 | Detroit | 3–1 | Washington | | Husso | 18,573 | 27–21–8 | 62 |
| 57 | February 23 | NY Rangers | 1–4 | Detroit | | Husso | 19,515 | 28–21–8 | 64 |
| 58 | February 25 | Tampa Bay | 3–0 | Detroit | | Husso | 19,515 | 28–22–8 | 64 |
| 59 | February 27 | Detroit | 2–6 | Ottawa | | Hellberg | 16,214 | 28–23–8 | 64 |
| 60 | February 28 | Detroit | 1–6 | Ottawa | | Husso | 14,071 | 28–24–8 | 64 |

March: 5–9–1 (Home: 4–3–1; Road: 1–6–0)
| # | Date | Visitor | Score | Home | OT | Decision | Attendance | Record | Pts | Recap |
|---|---|---|---|---|---|---|---|---|---|---|
| 61 | March 2 | Seattle | 5–4 | Detroit | OT | Husso | 19,515 | 28–24–9 | 65 |
| 62 | March 4 | Detroit | 1–4 | NY Islanders | | Hellberg | 17,255 | 28–25–9 | 65 |
| 63 | March 5 | Detroit | 1–3 | Philadelphia | | Husso | 17,630 | 28–26–9 | 65 |
| 64 | March 8 | Chicago | 3–4 | Detroit | | Husso | 19,181 | 29–26–9 | 67 |
| 65 | March 11 | Detroit | 2–3 | Boston | | Hellberg | 17,850 | 29–27–9 | 67 |
| 66 | March 12 | Boston | 3–5 | Detroit | | Husso | 19,515 | 30–27–9 | 69 |
| 67 | March 14 | Detroit | 1–2 | Nashville | | Husso | 17,644 | 30–28–9 | 69 |
| 68 | March 18 | Colorado | 5–1 | Detroit | | Husso | 19,515 | 30–29–9 | 69 |
| 69 | March 20 | Florida | 5–2 | Detroit | | Husso | 15,198 | 30–30–9 | 69 |
| 70 | March 21 | Detroit | 3–2 | St. Louis | SO | Hellberg | 18,096 | 31–30–9 | 71 |
| 71 | March 23 | St. Louis | 4–3 | Detroit | | Nedeljkovic | 17,036 | 31–31–9 | 71 |
| 72 | March 25 | Detroit | 0–3 | Philadelphia | | Nedeljkovic | 18,216 | 31–32–9 | 71 |
| 73 | March 28 | Pittsburgh | 4–7 | Detroit | | Nedeljkovic | 19,353 | 32–32–9 | 73 |
| 74 | March 30 | Carolina | 2–3 | Detroit | | Nedeljkovic | 19,183 | 33–32–9 | 75 |
| 75 | March 31 | Detroit | 2–6 | Winnipeg | | Hellberg | 14,389 | 33–33–9 | 75 |

April: 2–4–1 (Home: 0–2–1; Road: 2–2–0)
| # | Date | Visitor | Score | Home | OT | Decision | Attendance | Record | Pts | Recap |
|---|---|---|---|---|---|---|---|---|---|---|
| 76 | April 2 | Detroit | 5–2 | Toronto | | Nedeljkovic | 18,675 | 34–33–9 | 77 |
| 77 | April 4 | Detroit | 5–0 | Montreal | | Husso | 21,105 | 35–33–9 | 79 |
| 78 | April 6 | Buffalo | 7–6 | Detroit | SO | Husso | 19,367 | 35–33–10 | 80 |
| 79 | April 8 | Pittsburgh | 5–1 | Detroit | | Husso | 19,515 | 35–34–10 | 80 |
| 80 | April 10 | Dallas | 6–1 | Detroit | | Husso | 17,861 | 35–35–10 | 80 |
| 81 | April 11 | Detroit | 1–4 | Carolina | | Nedeljkovic | 18,680 | 35–36–10 | 80 |
| 82 | April 13 | Detroit | 0–5 | Tampa Bay | | Husso | 19,092 | 35–37–10 | 80 |

Legend: Win (2 points) Loss (0 points) Overtime/shootout loss (1 point)

== Awards and honours ==
=== Awards ===
Regular season
| Player | Award | Awarded |
|---|---|---|
| Lucas Raymond | NHL Second Star of the Week | January 16, 2023 |
| Dylan Larkin | NHL Second Star of the Week | February 6, 2023 |
| Dylan Larkin | NHL Third Star of the Week | February 20, 2023 |

=== Milestones ===
Regular season
| Player | Milestone | Reached |
|---|---|---|
| Elmer Soderblom | 1st career NHL game 1st career NHL point 1st career NHL goal | October 14, 2022 |
| Filip Hronek | 100th career NHL assist | October 21, 2022 |
| Oskar Sundqvist | 100th career NHL point | October 23, 2022 |
| Adam Erne | 300th career NHL game | October 25, 2022 |
| Gustav Lindstrom | 100th career NHL game | October 31, 2022 |
| Ben Chiarot | 500th career NHL game | November 5, 2022 |
| Jordan Oesterle | 300th career NHL game | November 6, 2022 |
| David Perron | 400th career NHL assist | November 12, 2022 |
| Andrew Copp | 500th career NHL game | November 17, 2022 |
| Lucas Raymond | 100th career NHL game | November 19, 2022 |
| Moritz Seider | 100th career NHL game | November 19, 2022 |
| Oskar Sundqvist | 300th career NHL game | November 23, 2022 |
| Michael Rasmussen | 200th career NHL game | November 25, 2022 |
| David Perron | 1,000th career NHL game | December 10, 2022 |
| Joe Veleno | 100th career NHL game | December 17, 2022 |
| Jake Walman | 100th career NHL game | January 12, 2023 |
| Simon Edvinsson | 1st career NHL game | March 18, 2023 |
| Alex Nedeljkovic | 100th career NHL game | March 28, 2023 |
| Matt Luff | 100th career NHL game | March 31, 2023 |
| Marco Kasper | 1st career NHL game | April 2, 2023 |

== Player statistics ==
=== Skaters ===
Regular season
| Player | GP | G | A | Pts | +/− | PIM |
|---|---|---|---|---|---|---|
| Dylan Larkin | 80 | 32 | 47 | 79 | –7 | 45 |
| David Perron | 82 | 24 | 32 | 56 | –7 | 52 |
| Dominik Kubalik | 81 | 20 | 25 | 45 | –15 | 24 |
| Lucas Raymond | 74 | 17 | 28 | 45 | –17 | 24 |
| Andrew Copp | 82 | 9 | 33 | 42 | 2 | 25 |
| Moritz Seider | 82 | 5 | 37 | 42 | –11 | 40 |
| Filip Hronek‡ | 60 | 9 | 29 | 38 | 8 | 34 |
| Michael Rasmussen | 56 | 10 | 19 | 29 | 2 | 43 |
| Jonatan Berggren | 67 | 15 | 13 | 28 | –14 | 16 |
| Pius Suter | 79 | 14 | 10 | 24 | –3 | 6 |
| Olli Maatta | 78 | 6 | 17 | 23 | –9 | 14 |
| Oskar Sundqvist | 52 | 7 | 14 | 21 | -4 | 20 |
| Joe Veleno | 81 | 9 | 11 | 20 | –12 | 30 |
| Ben Chiarot | 76 | 5 | 14 | 19 | –31 | 51 |
| Jake Walman | 63 | 9 | 9 | 18 | 10 | 45 |
| Adam Erne | 61 | 8 | 10 | 18 | –12 | 21 |
| Robby Fabbri | 28 | 7 | 9 | 16 | –1 | 22 |
| Tyler Bertuzzi‡ | 29 | 4 | 10 | 14 | –12 | 23 |
| Jordan Oesterle | 52 | 2 | 9 | 11 | –9 | 19 |
| Alex Chiasson | 20 | 6 | 3 | 9 | –8 | 6 |
| Elmer Soderblom | 21 | 5 | 3 | 8 | 0 | 8 |
| Gustav Lindstrom | 36 | 1 | 7 | 8 | –16 | 20 |
| Filip Zadina | 30 | 3 | 4 | 7 | –5 | 10 |
| Robert Hagg | 38 | 2 | 5 | 7 | –5 | 26 |
| Austin Czarnik | 29 | 3 | 2 | 5 | –4 | 8 |
| Matt Luff | 19 | 2 | 2 | 4 | –4 | 0 |
| Simon Edvinsson | 9 | 2 | 0 | 2 | –7 | 12 |
| Jakub Vrana‡ | 5 | 1 | 1 | 2 | +1 | 0 |
| Marco Kasper | 1 | 0 | 0 | 0 | 0 | 0 |
| Taro Hirose | 3 | 0 | 0 | 0 | -2 | 2 |
| Givani Smith‡ | 2 | 0 | 0 | 0 | -3 | 0 |

=== Goaltenders ===
Regular season
| Player | GP | GS | TOI | W | L | OT | GA | GAA | SA | SV% | SO | G | A | PIM |
|---|---|---|---|---|---|---|---|---|---|---|---|---|---|---|
| Ville Husso | 56 | 56 | 3,221 | 26 | 22 | 7 | 167 | 3.11 | 1,603 | .896 | 4 | 0 | 0 | 0 |
| Magnus Hellberg† | 17 | 13 | 877 | 4 | 8 | 0 | 48 | 3.29 | 416 | .885 | 0 | 0 | 0 | 0 |
| Alex Nedeljkovic | 15 | 13 | 833 | 5 | 7 | 2 | 49 | 3.53 | 466 | .895 | 0 | 0 | 0 | 0 |

^{†}Denotes player spent time with another team before joining the Red Wings. Stats reflect time with the Red Wings only.
^{‡}Denotes player was traded mid-season. Stats reflect time with the Red Wings only.
Bold/italics denotes franchise record.

== Transactions ==
The Red Wings have been involved in the following transactions during the 2022–23 season.

=== Trades ===
| Date | Details | | Ref |
|---|---|---|---|
| July 8, 2022 | To St. Louis Blues 3rd-round pick in 2022 | To Detroit Red Wings Ville Husso | |
| December 19, 2022 | To Florida Panthers Givani Smith | To Detroit Red Wings Michael Del Zotto | |
| December 19, 2022 | To Anaheim Ducks Michael Del Zotto | To Detroit Red Wings Danny O'Regan | |
| March 1, 2023 | To Vancouver Canucks Filip Hronek; 4th-round pick in 2023 | To Detroit Red Wings 1st-round pick in 2023; 2nd-round pick in 2023 | |
| March 2, 2023 | To Boston Bruins Tyler Bertuzzi | To Detroit Red Wings 1st-round pick in 2024; 4th-round pick in 2025 | |

=== Free agents ===
| Date | Player | Team | Contract term | Ref |
|---|---|---|---|---|
| July 13, 2022 | Ben Chiarot | from Florida Panthers | 4-year | |
| July 13, 2022 | Andrew Copp | from New York Rangers | 5-year | |
| July 13, 2022 | Austin Czarnik | from New York Islanders | 2-year | |
| July 13, 2022 | Thomas Greiss | to St. Louis Blues | 1-year | |
| July 13, 2022 | Magnus Hellberg | to Seattle Kraken | 2-year | |
| July 13, 2022 | Dominik Kubalik | from Chicago Blackhawks | 2-year | |
| July 13, 2022 | Matt Luff | from Nashville Predators | 1-year | |
| July 13, 2022 | David Perron | from St. Louis Blues | 2-year | |
| July 13, 2022 | Calvin Pickard | to Edmonton Oilers | 2-year | |
| July 13, 2022 | Dan Renouf | to Boston Bruins | 2-year | |
| July 13, 2022 | Marc Staal | to Florida Panthers | 1-year | |
| July 13, 2022 | Mitchell Stephens | to Montreal Canadiens | 1-year | |
| July 14, 2022 | Riley Barber | to Dallas Stars | 1-year | |
| July 14, 2022 | Olli Maatta | from Los Angeles Kings | 1-year | |
| July 14, 2022 | Mark Pysyk | from Buffalo Sabres | 1-year | |
| July 18, 2022 | Turner Elson | to New York Rangers | 1-year | |
| July 25, 2022 | Robert Hagg | from Florida Panthers | 1-year | |
| July 27, 2022 | Olli Juolevi | to Anaheim Ducks | 1-year | |
| September 2, 2022 | Sam Gagner | to Winnipeg Jets | 1-year | |
| September 12, 2022 | Carter Rowney | to Löwen Frankfurt | 1-year | |
| December 23, 2022 | Amadeus Lombardi | from Flint Firebirds | 3-year | |
| March 1, 2023 | Alexandre Doucet | from Halifax Mooseheads | 3-year | |

=== Signings ===
| Date | Player | Contract term | Ref |
|---|---|---|---|
| July 8, 2022 | Ville Husso | 3-year | |
| July 13, 2022 | Marco Kasper | 3-year | |
| July 21, 2022 | Chase Pearson | 1-year | |
| August 11, 2022 | Jake Walman | 1-year | |
| August 26, 2022 | Filip Zadina | 3-year | |
| February 16, 2023 | Olli Maatta | 2-year | |
| March 1, 2023 | Dylan Larkin | 8-year | |
| March 28, 2023 | Carter Mazur | 3-year | |

== Draft picks ==
Below are the Detroit Red Wings' selections at the 2022 NHL entry draft, which was held on July 7 and 8, 2022, at the Bell Centre in Montreal.

| Round | # | Player | Pos | Nationality | College/Junior/Club team (League) |
|---|---|---|---|---|---|
| 1 | 8 | Marco Kasper | C | Austria | Rogle BK (SHL) |
| 2 | 40 | Dylan James | LW | Canada | Sioux City Musketeers (USHL) |
| 2 | 52^{1} | Dmitri Buchelnikov | LW | Russia | SKA-1946 (JHL) |
| 4 | 105 | Anton Johansson | D | Sweden | Leksands IF (SHL) |
| 4 | 113^{2} | Amadeus Lombardi | C | Canada | Flint Firebirds (OHL) |
| 4 | 129^{3} | Maximilian Kilpinen | LW | Sweden | Örebro HK (J20) |
| 5 | 137 | Tnias Mathruin | D | Canada | North Bay Battalion (OHL) |
| 7 | 201 | Owen Mehlenbacher | C | Canada | Muskegon Lumberjacks (USHL) |
| 7 | 212^{4} | Brennan Ali | C | United States | Avon Old Farms (US-Prep) |

Notes:

1. The Washington Capitals' second-round pick went to the Detroit Red Wings as the result of a trade on April 12, 2021, that sent Anthony Mantha to Washington in exchange for Richard Panik, Jakub Vrana, a first-round pick in 2021 and this pick.
2. The Vegas Golden Knights' fourth-round pick went go to the Detroit Red Wings as the result of a trade on October 7, 2020, that sent a fourth-round pick in 2020 (125th overall) to Vegas in exchange for this pick.
3. The Colorado Avalanche's fourth-round pick went to the Detroit Red Wings as the result of a trade on April 9, 2021, that sent Patrik Nemeth to Colorado in exchange for this pick.
4. The Los Angeles Kings' seventh-round pick went to the Detroit Red Wings as the result of a trade on March 20, 2022, that sent Troy Stecher to Los Angeles in exchange for this pick.
