= 2022–23 Colorado Avalanche season =

National Hockey League season

2022–23 Colorado Avalanche
- Central Division champions
- Division: 1st Central
- Conference: 3rd Western
- 2022–23 record: 51–24–7
- Home record: 22–13–6
- Road record: 29–11–1
- Goals for: 280
- Goals against: 226

Team information
- General manager: Chris MacFarland
- Coach: Jared Bednar
- Captain: Gabriel Landeskog
- Alternate captains: Nathan MacKinnon; Mikko Rantanen
- Arena: Ball Arena
- Average attendance: 17,991
- Minor league affiliates: Colorado Eagles (AHL); Utah Grizzlies (ECHL)

Team leaders
- Goals: Mikko Rantanen (55)
- Assists: Nathan MacKinnon (69)
- Points: Nathan MacKinnon (111)
- Penalty minutes: Mikko Rantanen (82)
- Plus/minus: Devon Toews (+39)
- Wins: Alexandar Georgiev (40)
- Goals against average: Jonas Johansson (2.10)

The 2022–23 Colorado Avalanche season was the 44th season for the Avalanche as the National Hockey League (NHL) franchise that joined the league in 1979, the 27th playing season since the franchise relocated from Quebec prior to the start of the 1995–96 NHL season, and the 51st season overall, including their play in the World Hockey Association (WHA), where the franchise was established in 1972. They entered the season as the defending Stanley Cup champions.

On April 4, 2023, the Avalanche clinched a playoff spot after an overtime win against the San Jose Sharks. They were upset in the first round by the Seattle Kraken, losing in seven games.

== Standings ==
=== Divisional standings ===
Central Division
Pos	Team	GP	W	L	OTL	RW	GF	GA	GD	Pts
1	y – Colorado Avalanche	82	51	24	7	36	280	226	+54	109
2	x – Dallas Stars	82	47	21	14	39	285	218	+67	108
3	x – Minnesota Wild	82	46	25	11	34	246	225	+21	103
4	x – Winnipeg Jets	82	46	33	3	36	247	225	+22	95
5	Nashville Predators	82	42	32	8	29	229	238	−9	92
6	St. Louis Blues	82	37	38	7	27	263	301	−38	81
7	Arizona Coyotes	82	28	40	14	20	228	299	−71	70
8	Chicago Blackhawks	82	26	49	7	18	204	301	−97	59

Source: National Hockey League
Rules for classification: 1) Fewer number of games played (GP, only during regular season); 2) Greater number of regulation wins (RW); 3) Greater number of wins in regulation and overtime, excluding shootout wins (ROW); 4) Greater number of total wins, including shootouts (W); 5) Greater number of points earned in head-to-head play; if teams played an uneven number of head-to-head games, the result of the first game on the home ice of the team with the extra home game is discarded; 6) Greater goal differential (GD); 7) Greater number of goals scored (GF)
x – Clinched playoff spot; y – Clinched division

=== Conference standings ===
Western Conference Wild Card
Pos	Div	Team	GP	W	L	OTL	RW	GF	GA	GD	Pts
1	PA	x – Seattle Kraken	82	46	28	8	37	289	256	+33	100
2	CE	x – Winnipeg Jets	82	46	33	3	36	247	225	+22	95
3	PA	Calgary Flames	82	38	27	17	31	260	252	+8	93
4	CE	Nashville Predators	82	42	32	8	29	229	238	−9	92
5	PA	Vancouver Canucks	82	38	37	7	24	276	298	−22	83
6	CE	St. Louis Blues	82	37	38	7	27	263	301	−38	81
7	CE	Arizona Coyotes	82	28	40	14	20	228	299	−71	70
8	PA	San Jose Sharks	82	22	44	16	16	234	321	−87	60
9	CE	Chicago Blackhawks	82	26	49	7	18	204	301	−97	59
10	PA	Anaheim Ducks	82	23	47	12	13	209	338	−129	58

Source: National Hockey League
Rules for classification: 1) Fewer number of games played (GP, only during regular season); 2) Greater number of regulation wins (RW); 3) Greater number of wins in regulation and overtime, excluding shootout wins (ROW); 4) Greater number of total wins, including shootouts (W); 5) Greater number of points earned in head-to-head play; if teams played an uneven number of head-to-head games, the result of the first game on the home ice of the team with the extra home game is discarded; 6) Greater goal differential (GD); 7) Greater number of goals scored (GF)
x – Clinched playoff spot

== Schedule and results ==
=== Preseason ===
2022 preseason game log: 3–2–1 (home: 2–1–0; road: 1–1–1)
#	Date	Away	Score	Home	Decision	Location	Attendance	Record	Recap
1^{A}	September 25	Colorado	2–3 OT	Minnesota	Annunen	Xcel Energy Center	14,199	0–0–1
2^{A}	September 25	Vegas	1–3	Colorado	Johnansson	Ball Arena	14,137	1–0–1
3	September 27	Minnesota	5–2	Colorado	Francouz	Ball Arena	13,706	1–1–1
4	September 28	Colorado	1–7	Vegas	Georgiev	T-Mobile Arena	17,169	1–2–1
5	October 3	Colorado	3–1	Dallas	Francouz	American Airlines Center	12,678	2–2–1
6	October 5	Dallas	1–2	Colorado	Georgiev	Ball Arena	14,953	3–2–1
Legend: Win (2 points) Loss (0 points) OT/SO loss (1 point) ^{A} – Split Squad

=== Regular season ===
2022–23 game log

October: 4–4–1 (home: 1–1–1; road: 3–3–0)
#	Date	Visitor	Score	Home	OT	Decision	Attendance	Record	Pts	Recap
1	October 12	Chicago	2–5	Colorado		Georgiev	18,143	1–0–0	2
2	October 13	Colorado	3–5	Calgary		Francouz	19,289	1–1–0	2
3	October 17	Colorado	6–3	Minnesota		Georgiev	17,437	2–1–0	4
4	October 19	Winnipeg	4–3	Colorado	OT	Georgiev	18,062	2–1–1	5
5	October 21	Seattle	3–2	Colorado		Francouz	18,131	2–2–1	5
6	October 22	Colorado	3–2	Vegas		Georgiev	18,207	3–2–1	7
7	October 25	Colorado	3–2	NY Rangers	SO	Georgiev	18,006	4–2–1	9
8	October 28	Colorado	0–1	New Jersey		Francouz	12,502	4–3–1	9
9	October 29	Colorado	4–5	NY Islanders		Georgiev	17,255	4–4–1	9

November: 8–3–0 (home: 4–2–0; road: 4–1–0)
#	Date	Visitor	Score	Home	OT	Decision	Attendance	Record	Pts	Recap
10	November 4^{[a]}	Columbus	3–6	Colorado		Georgiev	12,882	5–4–1	11
11	November 5^{[a]}	Colorado	5–1	Columbus		Georgiev	12,897	6–4–1	13
12	November 10	Nashville	3–5	Colorado		Georgiev	18,134	7–4–1	15
13	November 12	Carolina	1–4	Colorado		Francouz	18,127	8–4–1	17
14	November 14	St. Louis	3–2	Colorado		Georgiev	18,104	8–5–1	17
15	November 17	Colorado	3–2	Carolina	OT	Francouz	18,680	9–5–1	19
16	November 19	Colorado	4–0	Washington		Georgiev	18,573	10–5–1	21
17	November 21	Colorado	3–2	Dallas	SO	Georgiev	18,532	11–5–1	23
18	November 23	Vancouver	4–3	Colorado		Francouz	18,132	11–6–1	23
—	November 25	Colorado		Nashville	Postponed due to a water main break at Bridgestone Arena. Moved to April 14.
19	November 26	Dallas	1–4	Colorado		Georgiev	18,129	12–6–1	25
20	November 29	Colorado	0–5	Winnipeg		Georgiev	13,510	12–7–1	25

December: 7–6–2 (home: 4–3–2; road: 3–3–0)
#	Date	Visitor	Score	Home	OT	Decision	Attendance	Record	Pts	Recap
21	December 1	Colorado	6–4	Buffalo		Georgiev	12,805	13–7–1	27
22	December 3	Colorado	1–5	Boston		Francouz	17,850	13–8–1	27
23	December 5	Colorado	3–5	Philadelphia		Georgiev	18,361	13–9–1	27
24	December 7	Boston	4–0	Colorado		Georgiev	18,119	13–10–1	27
25	December 9	NY Rangers	2–1	Colorado	SO	Georgiev	18,112	13–10–2	28
26	December 11	Colorado	3–2	St. Louis	OT	Francouz	18,096	14–10–2	30
27	December 13	Philadelphia	2–3	Colorado		Francouz	18,082	15–10–2	32
28	December 15	Buffalo	4–2	Colorado		Georgiev	18,103	15–11–2	32
29	December 17	Nashville	1–3	Colorado		Georgiev	18,131	16–11–2	34
30	December 19	NY Islanders	0–1	Colorado	SO	Georgiev	18,110	17–11–2	36
31	December 21	Montreal	1–2	Colorado	OT	Georgiev	18,091	18–11–2	38
32	December 23	Colorado	3–2	Nashville	OT	Georgiev	17,159	19–11–2	40
33	December 27	Colorado	3–6	Arizona		Georgiev	4,600	19–12–2	40
34	December 29	Los Angeles	5–4	Colorado	SO	Georgiev	18,132	19–12–3	41
35	December 31	Toronto	6–2	Colorado		Georgiev	18,136	19–13–3	41

January: 8–5–0 (home: 4–3–0; road: 4–2–0)
#	Date	Visitor	Score	Home	OT	Decision	Attendance	Record	Pts	Recap
36	January 2	Vegas	3–2	Colorado		Georgiev	18,092	19–14–3	41
37	January 5	Colorado	2–4	Vancouver		Georgiev	18,706	19–15–3	41
38	January 7	Colorado	3–2	Edmonton	OT	Georgiev	18,347	20–15–3	43
39	January 10	Florida	5–4	Colorado		Georgiev	18,102	20–16–3	43
40	January 12	Colorado	2–3	Chicago		Francouz	16,532	20–17–3	43
41	January 14	Ottawa	0–7	Colorado		Francouz	18,124	21–17–3	45
42	January 16	Detroit	3–6	Colorado		Francouz	18,117	22–17–3	47
43	January 18	Colorado	4–1	Calgary		Georgiev	17,768	23–17–3	49
44	January 20	Colorado	4–1	Vancouver		Georgiev	18,813	24–17–3	51
45	January 21	Colorado	2–1	Seattle	SO	Francouz	17,151	25–17–3	53
46	January 24	Washington	2–3	Colorado		Georgiev	18,132	26–17–3	55
47	January 26	Anaheim	5–3	Colorado		Francouz	18,124	26–18–3	55
48	January 28	St. Louis	2–4	Colorado		Georgiev	18,137	27–18–3	57

February: 7–1–2 (home: 3–0–1; road: 4–1–1)
#	Date	Visitor	Score	Home	OT	Decision	Attendance	Record	Pts	Recap
49	February 7	Colorado	1–2	Pittsburgh	OT	Francouz	18,096	27–18–4	58
50	February 9	Colorado	0–5	Tampa Bay		Georgiev	19,092	27–19–4	58
51	February 11	Colorado	5–3	Florida		Georgiev	17,472	28–19–4	60
52	February 14	Tampa Bay	4–3	Colorado	SO	Georgiev	18,072	28–19–5	61
53	February 15	Colorado	3–2	Minnesota		Georgiev	17,965	29–19–5	63
54	February 18	Colorado	4–1	St. Louis		Annunen	18,096	30–19–5	65
55	February 19	Edmonton	5–6	Colorado	OT	Georgiev	18,134	31–19–5	67
56	February 24	Colorado	5–1	Winnipeg		Georgiev	14,157	32–19–5	69
57	February 25	Calgary	1–4	Colorado		Georgiev	18,131	33–19–5	71
58	February 27	Vegas	0–3	Colorado		Georgiev	18,117	34–19–5	73

March: 10–5–1 (home: 4–4–1; road: 6–1–0)
#	Date	Visitor	Score	Home	OT	Decision	Attendance	Record	Pts	Recap
59	March 1	New Jersey	7–5	Colorado		Annunen	18,131	34–20–5	73
60	March 4	Colorado	3–7	Dallas		Georgiev	18,532	34–21–5	73
61	March 5	Seattle	3–2	Colorado	OT	Georgiev	18,107	34–21–6	74
62	March 7	San Jose	0–6	Colorado		Georgiev	18,092	35–21–6	76
63	March 9	Los Angeles	5–2	Colorado		Georgiev	18,117	35–22–6	76
64	March 11	Arizona	2–3	Colorado	OT	Georgiev	18,124	36–22–6	78
65	March 13	Colorado	8–4	Montreal		Georgiev	21,105	37–22–6	80
66	March 15	Colorado	2–1	Toronto	SO	Georgiev	19,102	38–22–6	82
67	March 16	Colorado	5–4	Ottawa		Johansson	19,158	39–22–6	84
68	March 18	Colorado	5–1	Detroit		Georgiev	19,515	40–22–6	86
69	March 20	Chicago	0–5	Colorado		Georgiev	18,121	41–22–6	88
70	March 22	Pittsburgh	5–2	Colorado		Georgiev	18,130	41–23–6	88
71	March 24	Arizona	1–3	Colorado		Georgiev	18,136	42–23–6	90
72	March 26	Colorado	4–3	Arizona	SO	Georgiev	4,600	43–23–6	92
73	March 27	Colorado	5–1	Anaheim		Johansson	13,158	44–23–6	94
74	March 29	Minnesota	4–2	Colorado		Georgiev	18,140	44–24–6	94

April: 7–0–1 (home: 2–0–1; road: 5–0–0)
#	Date	Visitor	Score	Home	OT	Decision	Attendance	Record	Pts	Recap
75	April 1	Dallas	2–5	Colorado		Georgiev	18,139	45–24–6	96
76	April 4	Colorado	4–3	San Jose	OT	Georgiev	11,067	46–24–6	98
77	April 6	Colorado	6–2	San Jose		Georgiev	12,772	47–24–6	100
78	April 8	Colorado	4–3	Los Angeles		Georgiev	18,230	48–24–6	102
79	April 9	Colorado	5–4	Anaheim	OT	Francouz	13,992	49–24–6	104
80	April 11	Edmonton	2–1	Colorado	OT	Georgiev	18,135	49–24–7	105
81	April 13	Winnipeg	2–4	Colorado		Georgiev	18,137	50–24–7	107
82	April 14	Colorado	4–3	Nashville		Georgiev	17,159	51–24–7	109

Legend: Win (2 points) Loss (0 points) Overtime/shootout loss (1 point)
Notes:
^{a} Game was played at Nokia Arena in Tampere, Finland.

=== Playoffs ===
2023 Stanley Cup playoffs

Western Conference first round vs. (WC1) Seattle Kraken: Seattle won 4–3
#	Date	Visitor	Score	Home	OT	Decision	Attendance	Series	Recap
1	April 18	Seattle	3–1	Colorado		Georgiev	18,138	0–1
2	April 20	Seattle	2–3	Colorado		Georgiev	18,141	1–1
3	April 22	Colorado	6–4	Seattle		Georgiev	17,151	2–1
4	April 24	Colorado	2–3	Seattle	OT	Georgiev	17,151	2–2
5	April 26	Seattle	3–2	Colorado		Georgiev	18,143	2–3
6	April 28	Colorado	4–1	Seattle		Georgiev	17,151	3–3
7	April 30	Seattle	2–1	Colorado		Georgiev	18,143	3–4

Legend: Win Loss

== Player statistics ==
Final stats

=== Skaters ===
Regular season
Player	GP	G	A	Pts	+/–	PIM
Nathan MacKinnon	71	42	69	111	+29	30
Mikko Rantanen	82	55	50	105	+15	82
Cale Makar	60	17	49	66	+16	30
J. T. Compher	82	17	35	52	+8	33
Artturi Lehkonen	64	21	30	51	+8	28
Devon Toews	80	7	43	50	+39	26
Valeri Nichushkin	53	17	30	47	+15	2
Evan Rodrigues	69	16	23	39	+7	30
Sam Girard	76	6	31	37	−10	16
Alex Newhook	82	14	16	30	0	22
Logan O'Connor	82	9	17	26	+11	37
Bowen Byram	42	10	14	24	+7	38
Andrew Cogliano	79	10	9	19	+6	44
Denis Malgin^{†}	42	11	6	17	+5	4
Brad Hunt	47	4	6	10	+4	12
Josh Manson	27	2	8	10	+13	42
Matt Nieto^{†}	36	4	5	9	+7	8
Erik Johnson	63	0	8	8	+8	12
Lars Eller^{†}	24	3	4	7	+4	10
Kurtis MacDermid	44	1	5	6	−1	55
Ben Meyers	39	4	0	4	−6	6
Jack Johnson^{†}	25	2	2	4	+10	12
Martin Kaut^{‡}	27	1	2	3	−2	4
Andreas Englund^{‡}	36	0	3	3	+1	26
Jacob MacDonald^{‡}	33	0	2	2	−3	11
Dryden Hunt^{‡}	25	1	0	1	−7	13
Anton Blidh^{‡}	14	0	0	0	−2	4
Shane Bowers^{‡}	1	0	0	0	0	0
Callahan Burke	2	0	0	0	−1	0
Jean-Luc Foudy	9	0	0	0	−3	6
Alex Galchenyuk	11	0	0	0	−8	4
Darren Helm	11	0	0	0	−1	4
Charles Hudon	9	0	0	0	−2	2
Mikhail Maltsev	5	0	0	0	0	0
Jayson Megna^{‡}	14	0	0	0	−2	2
Oskar Olausson	1	0	0	0	0	0
Sampo Ranta	6	0	0	0	0	4
Lukas Sedlak^{‡}	3	0	0	0	+1	0

Playoffs
Player	GP	G	A	Pts	+/−	PIM
Mikko Rantanen	7	7	3	10	+4	2
Devon Toews	7	1	8	9	+5	0
Nathan MacKinnon	7	3	4	7	+8	4
Artturi Lehkonen	7	3	3	6	+3	6
Cale Makar	6	1	4	5	+5	6
Evan Rodrigues	7	1	4	5	+4	2
Bowen Byram	7	0	3	3	+1	0
J. T. Compher	7	1	1	2	–2	0
Sam Girard	7	0	2	2	–4	2
Erik Johnson	7	1	0	1	0	0
Valeri Nichushkin	2	1	0	1	–2	0
Alex Newhook	7	0	1	1	–3	4
Andrew Cogliano	4	0	0	0	0	0
Lars Eller	7	0	0	0	–1	0
Darren Helm	1	0	0	0	–1	0
Brad Hunt	1	0	0	0	0	0
Jack Johnson	3	0	0	0	0	2
Denis Malgin	7	0	0	0	–3	2
Josh Manson	5	0	0	0	–3	8
Ben Meyers	6	0	0	0	–2	2
Matt Nieto	7	0	0	0	0	2
Logan O'Connor	7	0	0	0	0	6

=== Goaltenders ===
Regular season
Player	GP	GS	TOI	W	L	OT	GA	GAA	SA	SV%	SO	G	A	PIM
Alexandar Georgiev	62	62	3700	40	16	6	156	2.53	1904	.918	5	0	1	0
Pavel Francouz	16	16	965	8	7	1	42	2.61	493	.915	1	0	1	0
Jonas Johansson^{†}	3	2	143	2	0	0	5	2.10	73	.932	0	0	0	0
Justus Annunen	2	2	117	1	1	0	7	3.58	48	.854	0	0	0	0
Keith Kinkaid^{†}	1	0	28	0	0	0	1	2.15	9	.889	0	0	0	0

Playoffs
Player	GP	GS	TOI	W	L	GA	GAA	SA	SV%	SO	G	A	PIM
Alexandar Georgiev	7	7	415	3	4	18	2.60	210	.914	0	0	0	0

^{†}Denotes player spent time with another team before joining the Avalanche. Stats reflect time with the Avalanche only.
^{‡}Denotes player was traded mid-season. Stats reflect time with the Avalanche only.
Bold/italics denotes franchise record.

== Transactions ==
The Avalanche have been involved in the following transactions during the 2022–23 season.

Key:

† Contract is entry-level.
‡ Contract initially takes effect in the 2023–24 season.

=== Trades ===
Date	Details		Ref
July 7, 2022	To New York Rangers 3rd-round pick in 2022; 3rd-round pick in 2023; 5th-round pick in 2022	To Colorado Avalanche Alexandar Georgiev	
December 19, 2022	To Toronto Maple Leafs Dryden Hunt	To Colorado Avalanche Denis Malgin	
January 25, 2023	To San Jose Sharks Martin Kaut; Jacob MacDonald	To Colorado Avalanche Ryan Merkley; Matt Nieto	
February 25, 2023	To Boston Bruins Shane Bowers	To Colorado Avalanche Keith Kinkaid	
February 26, 2023	To Chicago Blackhawks Andreas Englund	To Colorado Avalanche Jack Johnson	
March 1, 2023	To Washington Capitals 2nd-round pick in 2025	To Colorado Avalanche Lars Eller	
March 3, 2023	To New York Rangers Anton Blidh	To Colorado Avalanche Gustav Rydahl	

=== Players acquired ===
Date	Player	Former team	Term	Via	Ref
July 13, 2022	Andreas Englund	Colorado Eagles (AHL)	1-year	Free agency	
July 13, 2022	Charles Hudon	Tampa Bay Lightning	1-year	Free agency	
July 13, 2022	Josh Jacobs	Carolina Hurricanes	1-year	Free agency	
July 13, 2022	Jonas Johansson	Florida Panthers	1-year	Free agency	
July 13, 2022	Spencer Smallman	Carolina Hurricanes	2-year	Free agency	
July 15, 2022	Brad Hunt	Vancouver Canucks	2-year	Free agency	
August 5, 2022	Anton Blidh	Boston Bruins	1-year	Free agency	
September 12, 2022	Evan Rodrigues	Pittsburgh Penguins	1-year	Free agency	
September 12, 2022	Jonas Johansson	Arizona Coyotes		Waivers	
October 20, 2022	Dryden Hunt	New York Rangers		Waivers	
November 28, 2022	Alex Galchenyuk	Colorado Eagles (AHL)	1-year	Free agency	
March 30, 2023	Jason Polin	Western Michigan Broncos (NCHC)	1-year†‡	Free agency	
March 30, 2023	Sam Malinski	Cornell Big Red (ECAC)	2-year†‡	Free agency	
March 30, 2023	Ondřej Pavel	Minnesota State Mavericks (CCHA)	2-year†‡	Free agency	

=== Players lost ===
Date	Player	New team	Term	Via	Ref
July 13, 2022	Nicolas Aube-Kubel	Toronto Maple Leafs	1-year	Free agency	
July 13, 2022	Andre Burakovsky	Seattle Kraken	5-year	Free agency	
July 13, 2022	Dennis Gilbert	Calgary Flames	2-year	Free agency	
July 13, 2022	Darcy Kuemper	Washington Capitals	5-year	Free agency	
July 13, 2022	Nico Sturm	San Jose Sharks	3-year	Free agency	
July 14, 2022	Jordan Gross	Nashville Predators	2-year	Free agency	
July 14, 2022	Roland McKeown	Nashville Predators	2-year	Free agency	
July 14, 2022	Kiefer Sherwood	Nashville Predators	1-year	Free agency	
July 14, 2022	Dylan Sikura	Chicago Blackhawks	1-year	Free agency	
July 29, 2022	Stefan Matteau	Linköping HC (SHL)	2-year	Free agency	
August 17, 2022	Jack Johnson	Chicago Blackhawks	1-year	Free agency	
August 18, 2022	Nazem Kadri	Calgary Flames	7-year	Free agency	
September 2, 2022	Ryan Murray	Edmonton Oilers	1-year	Free agency	
September 30, 2022	Jonas Johansson	Arizona Coyotes		Waivers	
October 19, 2022	Lukas Sedlak	Philadelphia Flyers		Waivers	
December 6, 2022	Jayson Megna	Anaheim Ducks		Waivers	
December 19, 2022	Danila Zhuravlyov			Contract termination	
December 20, 2022	Danila Zhuravlyov	Ak Bars Kazan (KHL)	1-year	Free agency	
May 11, 2023	Gustav Rydahl	Frölunda HC (SHL)	5-year‡	Free agency	
May 25, 2023	Sampo Ranta	Modo Hockey (SHL)	2-year‡	Free agency	

=== Signings ===
Date	Player	Term	Ref
July 10, 2022	Alexandar Georgiev	3-year	
July 10, 2022	Jacob MacDonald	2-year	
July 11, 2022	Valeri Nichushkin	8-year	
July 13, 2022	Darren Helm	1-year	
July 13, 2022	Josh Manson	4-year	
July 13, 2022	Artturi Lehkonen	5-year	
July 19, 2022	Callahan Burke	1-year	
July 21, 2022	Keaton Middleton	1-year	
July 27, 2022	Mikhail Maltsev	1-year	
September 20, 2022	Nathan MacKinnon	8-year‡	
February 25, 2023	Keaton Middleton	2-year‡	
April 12, 2023	Callahan Burke	1-year‡	
May 30, 2023	Nate Clurman	1-year‡	
June 6, 2023	Wyatt Aamodt	1-year‡	
June 15, 2023	Fredrik Olofsson	1-year‡	

== Draft picks ==
Below are the Colorado Avalanche's selections at the 2022 NHL entry draft, which was held on July 7 to 8, 2022, at Bell Centre in Montreal.

Round	#	Player	Pos.	Nationality	Team (League)
6	193	Chris Romaine	D	USA	Milton Academy (USHS-Prep)
7	225	Ivan Zhigalov	G	Belarus	Sherbrooke Phoenix (QMJHL)
