= Steven Lorentz =

Canadian ice hockey player (born 1996)

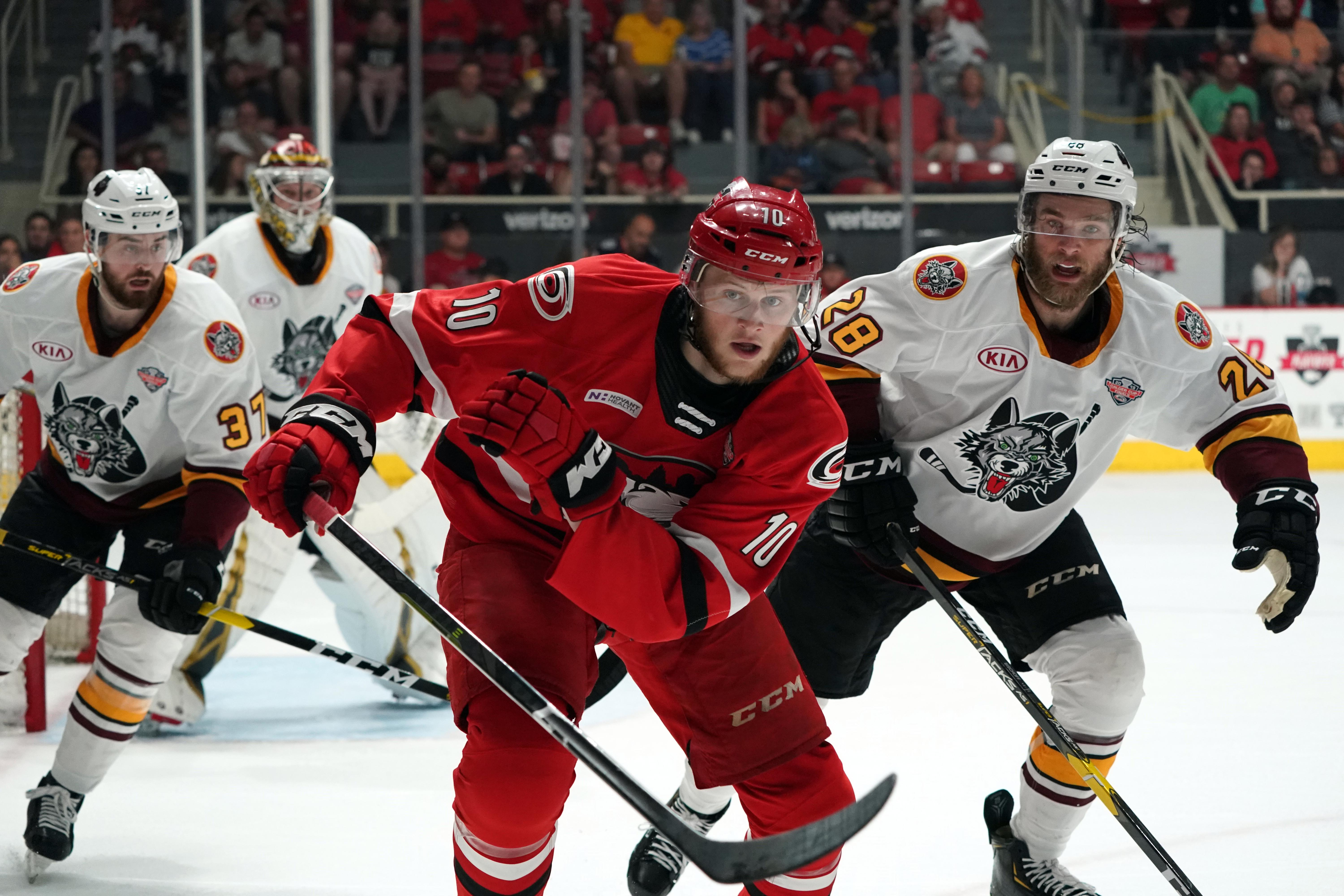
- Lorentz with the Charlotte Checkers in 2019
- Born: April 13, 1996 (age 30) Kitchener, Ontario, Canada
- Height: 6 ft 6 in (198 cm)
- Weight: 255 lb (116 kg; 18 st 3 lb)
- Position: Centre
- Shoots: Left
- NHL team Former teams: Columbus Blue Jackets; Carolina Hurricanes; San Jose Sharks; Florida Panthers; Toronto Maple Leafs
- NHL draft: 186th overall, 2015; Carolina Hurricanes
- Playing career: 2017–present

Steven Lorentz (born April 13, 1996) is a Canadian professional ice hockey player who is a centre for the Columbus Blue Jackets of the National Hockey League (NHL). The Carolina Hurricanes selected him in the seventh round, 186th overall, at the 2015 NHL entry draft. Lorentz won the Stanley Cup with the Florida Panthers in 2024.

== Early life ==
Lorentz was born on April 13, 1996, in Kitchener, Ontario. He was the only son of Mark and Karon Lorentz, he attended St. Nicholas Catholic Elementary School and Laurel Heights Secondary School. He was raised with his sisters in Waterloo, Ontario. He began ice skating at the age of two, and started playing organized minor ice hockey three years later. Although players his age were usually divided randomly among the four local teams, the coaches held a "draft lottery" for the skilled Lorentz.

Growing up, Lorentz was a fan of the Toronto Maple Leafs. His childhood bedroom was modeled after the team, including a Maple Leafs score clock for his light and several posters, and his favourite player was Mats Sundin. In 2024, after signing with Toronto, Lorentz went viral within the hockey community when he posted his childhood yearbook from 15 years ago, where he claimed that in 15 years he would be playing in the NHL for the Maple Leafs.

Although many fans, commentators and media personality pronounce Lorentz's last name in the literal sense, often saying 'Lo-rentz', Lorentz's name is pronounced as one would "Lawrence".

== Playing career ==
=== Junior ===
After leading the Waterloo Wolves AAA club in scoring, Lorentz was chosen by the Peterborough Petes in the 12th round, 226th overall, in the 2012 Ontario Hockey League Priority Selection.

=== Professional ===
==== Carolina Hurricanes ====
On June 27, 2015, the Carolina Hurricanes selected Lorentz in the seventh round, 186th overall in the 2015 NHL entry draft.

Following his fourth completed junior OHL season with the Peterborough Petes, the Hurricanes signed Lorentz on a three-year, entry-level contract on April 21, 2017.

Lorentz was one of those 31 players for the Hurricanes invited to the "bubble" as part of the 2020 Stanley Cup playoffs, but he did not play.

On October 15, 2020, the Hurricanes signed Lorentz to a two-year, two-way contract. In the pandemic delayed 2020–21 season, Lorentz made his NHL debut on January 28, 2021, in a game against the Tampa Bay Lightning. He subsequently recorded his first point on January 30 with an assist against the Dallas Stars. Lorentz scored his first career NHL goal on March 2, 2021, in a game against the Nashville Predators.

==== San Jose Sharks ====
On July 13, 2022, the Hurricanes traded Lorentz, goaltender Eetu Makiniemi and a conditional third-round selection in the 2023 NHL Entry Draft to the San Jose Sharks in exchange for Brent Burns and Lane Pederson. On July 22, the Sharks signed Lorentz to a two-year contract extension.

==== Florida Panthers ====
After a solitary season with the Sharks, on July 1, 2023, Lorentz was traded by the Sharks, along with a fifth-round selection in 2025, to the Florida Panthers in exchange for Anthony Duclair.

==== Toronto Maple Leafs ====
Following his Stanley Cup success with the Panthers, Lorentz left as a free agent at the conclusion of his contract and was un-signed over the summer. On September 5, 2024, Lorentz accepted an invitation to attend the Toronto Maple Leafs training camp for the 2024–25 season on a professional tryout. Following training camp, Lorentz signed a one-year contract with the Maple Leafs on October 7, 2024.

Starting the season on the Maple Leafs roster, Lorentz would score his first goal of the season in the team's second game, a 4–2 win over the New Jersey Devils on October 10.

== Playing style ==
Carolina Hurricanes Director of Amateur Scouting Tony MacDonald said of Lorentz in 2015, "He's a good two-way player who plays well with and without the puck."

== Career statistics ==
			Regular season					Playoffs
Season	Team	League	GP	G	A	Pts	PIM	GP	G	A	Pts	PIM
2013–14	Peterborough Petes	OHL	64	7	11	18	18	11	2	0	2	0
2014–15	Peterborough Petes	OHL	59	16	21	37	15	5	0	1	1	2
2015–16	Peterborough Petes	OHL	58	23	25	48	27	7	2	3	5	0
2016–17	Peterborough Petes	OHL	66	29	32	61	37	12	9	7	16	0
2017–18	Florida Everblades	ECHL	62	12	23	35	34	19	5	5	10	12
2017–18	Charlotte Checkers	AHL	3	0	0	0	0	—	—	—	—	—
2018–19	Florida Everblades	ECHL	22	10	18	28	11	—	—	—	—	—
2018–19	Charlotte Checkers	AHL	29	3	6	9	23	12	1	4	5	2
2019–20	Charlotte Checkers	AHL	61	23	23	46	37	—	—	—	—	—
2020–21	Carolina Hurricanes	NHL	45	2	6	8	8	11	0	3	3	4
2021–22	Carolina Hurricanes	NHL	67	8	5	13	8	5	0	0	0	17
2022–23	San Jose Sharks	NHL	80	10	9	19	16	—	—	—	—	—
2023–24	Florida Panthers	NHL	38	1	2	3	10	16	2	1	3	0
2024–25	Toronto Maple Leafs	NHL	80	8	11	19	9	13	0	2	2	4
2025–26	Toronto Maple Leafs	NHL	71	7	11	18	16	—	—	—	—	—
NHL totals			381	36	44	80	67	45	2	6	8	25

== Awards and honours ==
Award	Year	Ref
AHL
Calder Cup champion	2019	
NHL
Stanley Cup champion	2024	
