= Lane Pederson =

Canadian ice hockey player (born 1997)

- Born: August 4, 1997 (age 29) Saskatoon, Saskatchewan, Canada
- Height: 6 ft 0 in (183 cm)
- Weight: 192 lb (87 kg; 13 st 10 lb)
- Position: Centre
- Shoots: Right
- NHL team (P) Cur. team Former teams: Los Angeles Kings; Ontario Reign (AHL); Arizona Coyotes; San Jose Sharks; Vancouver Canucks; Columbus Blue Jackets; Philadelphia Flyers
- NHL draft: Undrafted
- Playing career: 2017–present

Lane Pederson (born August 4, 1997) is a Canadian professional ice hockey forward for the Ontario Reign of the American Hockey League (AHL) while under contract to the Los Angeles Kings of the National Hockey League (NHL).

== Playing career ==
Pederson played for the Seattle Thunderbirds, Red Deer Rebels and Swift Current Broncos in the Western Hockey League and signed as a free agent with the Coyotes in October 2016. After playing four seasons in the American Hockey League with the Tucson Roadrunners, he played his first NHL game on April 2, 2021, scoring a goal in a win against the Anaheim Ducks.

On July 28, 2021, Pederson was traded by the Coyotes to the San Jose Sharks in exchange for a 2024 fourth-round draft pick. He was waived on February 21, 2022, but cleared and returned to the San Jose Barracuda.

On July 13, 2022, Pederson was traded by the Sharks to the Carolina Hurricanes along with Brent Burns, in exchange for forward Steven Lorentz, goaltender Eetu Makiniemi and a conditional 2023 third-round selection. After attending the Hurricanes training camp, Pederson was re-assigned to AHL affiliate, the Chicago Wolves to begin the 2022–23 season. Pederson was scoreless in 4 games with the Wolves before he was traded by the Hurricanes alongside Ethan Bear to the Vancouver Canucks in exchange for a fifth-round pick in 2023.

Initially assigned to the Abbotsford Canucks, Pederson instantly found his offensive touch by scoring 17 goals in only 18 games. Recalled to the NHL, Pederson made his Canucks debut against the Winnipeg Jets on December 17, 2022. He later notched his first goal with the Canucks in recording a multi-point game against the Seattle Kraken on December 22, 2022. After 11 games with the Canucks, Pederson was placed on waivers and was subsequently claimed by the Columbus Blue Jackets on January 28, 2023.

As a free agent from the Blue Jackets, Pederson was signed on the opening day of free agency to a two-year, $1.55 million contract with the Edmonton Oilers on July 1, 2023.

He signed a one-year, two-way contract with the Philadelphia Flyers on July 1, 2025.

Pederson signed as a free agent to a two-year, two-way contract with the Los Angeles Kings on July 1, 2026.

== Career statistics ==
=== Regular season and playoffs ===
			Regular season					Playoffs
Season	Team	League	GP	G	A	Pts	PIM	GP	G	A	Pts	PIM
2012–13	Saskatoon Blazers	SMAAAHL	38	14	21	35	20	7	3	4	7	0
2013–14	Saskatoon Blazers	SMAAAHL	37	21	20	41	16	—	—	—	—	—
2013–14	Seattle Thunderbirds	WHL	2	0	0	0	0	3	0	0	0	0
2014–15	Seattle Thunderbirds	WHL	63	8	12	20	17	6	0	0	0	0
2015–16	Red Deer Rebels	WHL	35	6	15	21	19	—	—	—	—	—
2015–16	Swift Current Broncos	WHL	37	14	20	34	29	—	—	—	—	—
2016–17	Swift Current Broncos	WHL	62	25	40	65	39	12	3	4	7	0
2017–18	Tucson Roadrunners	AHL	63	12	14	26	18	9	3	1	4	4
2018–19	Tucson Roadrunners	AHL	67	23	24	47	36	—	—	—	—	—
2019–20	Tucson Roadrunners	AHL	37	16	18	34	40	—	—	—	—	—
2020–21	Tucson Roadrunners	AHL	16	7	10	17	6	—	—	—	—	—
2020–21	Arizona Coyotes	NHL	15	1	2	3	2	—	—	—	—	—
2021–22	San Jose Sharks	NHL	29	0	2	2	10	—	—	—	—	—
2021–22	San Jose Barracuda	AHL	22	9	9	18	8	—	—	—	—	—
2022–23	Chicago Wolves	AHL	4	0	0	0	4	—	—	—	—	—
2022–23	Abbotsford Canucks	AHL	18	17	7	24	18	—	—	—	—	—
2022–23	Vancouver Canucks	NHL	11	1	2	3	15	—	—	—	—	—
2022–23	Columbus Blue Jackets	NHL	16	2	1	3	11	—	—	—	—	—
2023–24	Bakersfield Condors	AHL	66	22	30	52	40	2	1	0	1	2
2024–25	Bakersfield Condors	AHL	18	5	7	12	20	—	—	—	—	—
2025–26	Lehigh Valley Phantoms	AHL	63	23	25	48	44	—	—	—	—	—
2025–26	Philadelphia Flyers	NHL	5	0	0	0	0	—	—	—	—	—
NHL totals			76	4	7	11	38	—	—	—	—	—

=== International ===
Year	Team	Event	Result	GP	G	A	Pts	PIM
2014	Canada Western	U17	9th	5	0	3	3	2
Junior totals				5	0	3	3	2
