= Eetu Mäkiniemi =

Finnish ice hockey player (born 1999)

- Born: 19 April 1999 (age 27) Vantaa, Finland
- Height: 6 ft 2 in (188 cm)
- Weight: 184 lb (83 kg; 13 st 2 lb)
- Position: Goaltender
- Catches: Left
- Liiga team Former teams: HC TPS; Ilves; San Jose Sharks
- NHL draft: 104th overall, 2017; Carolina Hurricanes
- Playing career: 2018–present

Eetu Mäkiniemi (born 19 April 1999) is a Finnish professional ice hockey goaltender for HC TPS in the Liiga. He was drafted 104th overall by the Carolina Hurricanes in the fourth round of the 2017 NHL entry draft and has previously played in the National Hockey League (NHL) with the San Jose Sharks.

== Playing career ==
=== Europe ===
As a youth, Mäkiniemi played minor hockey for Kiekko-Vantaa before playing junior hockey for Jokerit. He represented Jokerit U20 in 2016–17 and 2017–18 for the Junior Club World Cup (JCWC).

Mäkiniemi was transferred to Kiekko-Vantaa for the 2018–19 Mestis season, however, he was out for part of the season with a hip injury.

In April 2019, Ilves signed Mäkiniemi to a two-year contract with a one-year extension option. On 28 December 2019, he made his Liiga debut in a 2–1 win against KooKoo. On 28 November 2020, he recorded his first Liiga shutout against KalPa with 24 shots saved.

=== North America ===
On 1 May 2021, the Carolina Hurricanes signed Mäkiniemi to a two-year, entry-level contract. Mäkiniemi in his first 14 appearances for the Hurricanes' AHL affiliate, the Chicago Wolves, posted a sparking 11–2–1 mark with a .922 save percentage and two shutouts, and he yielded two goals or less nine times, including a 41-save performance at Milwaukee on 22 October 2021, to earn a 3–2 win in his AHL debut.

On 13 July 2022, Mäkiniemi, Steven Lorentz and a third-round pick in the 2023 NHL entry draft were traded to the San Jose Sharks in exchange for Brent Burns and Lane Pederson. He made his NHL debut on 7 December 2022, in a 6–5 overtime loss to the Vancouver Canucks. In June 2023, he re-signed with the Sharks on a one-year contract.

At the conclusion of his contract with the Sharks, Mäkiniemi left as a free agent and was un-signed over the summer. On 30 August 2024, he accepted an invitation to attend the Philadelphia Flyers training camp for the 2024–25 season on a professional tryout, later agreeing to a one-year contract on 24 September.

Mäkiniemi signed a one-year contract with HC TPS on 11 June 2025.

== Career statistics ==
			Regular season									Playoffs
Season	Team	League	GP	W	L	T/OT	MIN	GA	SO	GAA	SV%	GP	W	L	MIN	GA	SO	GAA	SV%
2016–17	Jokerit	Jr. A	26	—	—	—	—	—	—	2.68	.914	—	—	—	—	—	—	—	—
2017–18	Jokerit	Jr. A	35	—	—	—	—	—	—	3.03	.916	—	—	—	—	—	—	—	—
2018–19	Jokerit	Jr. A	1	—	—	—	—	—	—	9.00	.735	—	—	—	—	—	—	—	—
2018–19	Kiekko-Vantaa	Mestis	13	4	7	2	773	38	1	2.92	.905	—	—	—	—	—	—	—	—
2019–20	Koovee	Mestis	26	14	4	8	1592	80	1	3.01	.908	—	—	—	—	—	—	—	—
2019–20	Ilves	Liiga	7	2	0	4	352	9	0	1.53	.936	—	—	—	—	—	—	—	—
2020–21	Ilves	Liiga	34	13	14	7	2039	88	2	2.59	.907	5	1	4	298	15	0	3.02	.915
2021–22	Chicago Wolves	AHL	14	11	2	1	843	29	2	2.06	.922	—	—	—	—	—	—	—	—
2022–23	San Jose Barracuda	AHL	22	8	10	3	1,214	60	2	2.96	.900	—	—	—	—	—	—	—	—
2022–23	San Jose Sharks	NHL	2	1	1	0	85	3	0	2.13	.906	—	—	—	—	—	—	—	—
2023–24	San Jose Barracuda	AHL	18	8	8	0	935	49	3	3.14	.900	—	—	—	—	—	—	—	—
2023–24	Wichita Thunder	ECHL	3	1	2	0	177	10	0	3.39	.907	—	—	—	—	—	—	—	—
2024–25	Lehigh Valley Phantoms	AHL	5	3	0	1	277	14	0	3.03	.899	—	—	—	—	—	—	—	—
Liiga totals			41	15	14	11	2391	97	2	2.43	.911	5	1	4	298	15	0	3.02	.915
NHL totals			2	1	1	0	85	3	0	2.13	.906	—	—	—	—	—	—	—	—

== Awards and honors ==
Award	Year
Mestis
Best Goaltender	2019–20
Second All-Star Team	2019–20
