= Virtual advertising =

Advertising digitally inserted into TV images

Virtual advertising is the use of digital technology to insert virtual advertisements into a live or pre-recorded television show, often in sports events.

This technique is often used to allow broadcasters to overlay existing physical advertising panels inside the sports venue with virtual content on the screen when broadcasting the same event in multiple regions; a Spanish football game can be broadcast in Mexico with Mexican advertisements. Similarly, virtual content can be inserted onto empty space within the sports venue such as the pitch, where physical advertising cannot be placed due to regulatory or safety reasons. Virtual advertising content is intended to be photorealistic, so that the viewer has the impression they are seeing the real in-stadium advertising.

== History ==
Throughout the 1980s, 1990s, and 2000s, advertising on television and in newspapers was a popular method of spreading information. The marketer Jeremiah Lynwood stated that "Thirty years ago, [U.S.] consumers viewed an average of 560 ads per day", mostly from newspapers, television shows, gasoline pumps, and so on. Lynwood also stated that, at the time, "American consumers may be exposed to 3,000 commercial messages every day". Within that time frame, the exposure of daily ads have supported many local and big businesses. With the arrival of the 2000s and 2010s, technological advances have created new opportunities for many businesses to grow.

In the 21st century, virtual advertising has been used to create virtual product placements in television shows hours, days, or years after they have been produced. Advertisements can be targeted to regional markets and updated over time to ensure maximum efficiency of advertising money. A good example of how virtual advertising is used in everyday life is in sports. Virtual advertising uses the latest technology to place an ad in position to the field of play, regardless of camera motion, and the players' movement over the logos. Recently, the NHL have virtually inserted sponsors on the glass above the physical boards in NHL stadiums. Big brands will not spend their time or money on hitting a certain region when their main goal is to build global brand awareness. Digital signage opportunities allow these larger brands to purchase signage in a stadium during games that are instead nationally televised. This gets even more expansive thanks to social media outlets like Twitter, Facebook, and Amazon. On the other hand, local businesses sign when there are smaller games going on. The signage is much more affordable and still reaches a vast number of people. Virtual advertising may even make live attendance more attractive to sport fans because the technology allows the playing field and surrounding areas to be cleared of advertisements while television viewers at home are exposed to commercials. For the most part, virtual advertising makes a live attendance more attractive to sports fans, because instead of being at home watching commercials, live fans are able to be clear of advertisements and enjoy the game without pop-up ads.

== Technology ==
The technology used in virtual insertions often uses automated processes such as: automatic detection of playfield limits, automatic detection of cuts, recognition of playfield surface, recognition of existing logos for logo replacements, etc.

An operator is usually dedicated to the visual control of the effect but new systems allow to use the instant replay operator.

== Examples ==
=== Live events ===
Virtual advertisements can be effectively integrated into live television in real-time. For example, Fox Sports Net places a virtual advertisement on the glass behind the goaltender that can only be seen on television. The advertising in the playfields is property of the club, except in some professional sports where the league or federation owns the advertising rights. However, the advertising rights broadcast on the screen are property of the broadcasters or the TV channel. This means that second right holders can benefit from selling this virtual advertising. The number of TV viewers is also higher than the people in the stadium, generating more visibility to the advertised marks and more income to the broadcasters.

Virtual advertising was first introduced in football during the 2015 Audi Cup at the Allianz Arena in Munich. AIM Sport implemented the technology to digitally overlay advertisements on the stadium's perimeter boards, allowing different sponsors to be displayed to viewers in different broadcast regions.

In Formula One, virtual ads are placed on the grass or as virtual billboards.

In baseball, Major League Baseball places virtual advertisements on a back-board behind the batter which can be targeted differently in local markets or countries. During the World Series, MLB international broadcasts of the World Series feature different advertisements on a per market basis, showing a different ad in the US, Canadian, Latin American and Japanese markets.

In tennis, e.g. during the 2019 ATP Finals in London's O2 Arena certain logos in the background were replaced for various country feeds.

In table tennis e.g. during the ITTF World Tour Australian Open 2019 virtual advertising overlays were used by uniqFEED AG in Switzerland.

Since the 2022–23 season, the National Hockey League (NHL) has used digitally enhanced dasherboards (DED) to erase and replace ads on each arena's boards with up to 120 thirty-second segments on all or part of the rink. Each broadcaster can use a different set of ads. DED were first used at the 2016 World Cup of Hockey, which was organized by the NHL.

At UEFA Euro 2024, AIM Sport provided virtual advertising for all matches, marking one of the largest implementations of the technology in an international tournament. In addition to the tournament itself, virtual advertising was also used in the participating teams' domestic matches, extending region-specific advertising beyond the competition itself.
