= Digitally enhanced dasherboard =

Ice hockey virtual advertising product

A digitally enhanced dasherboard (DED) is a virtual advertising product offered by the National Hockey League (NHL) for television broadcasts of ice hockey games. DEDs erase and replace the local ads painted on dasher boards that surround hockey rinks with a sequence of static and animated advertisements on each television broadcaster.

== History ==
The first NHL team to sell advertising on its dasher boards was the Minnesota North Stars in 1981. Since then, all teams have sold ads to a mixture of national sponsors and local advertisers. The NHL promotes the DED program as a way for a team's sponsors to continue to advertise on television broadcasts of away games. The NHL had previously introduced virtual advertising over the goal in 2011; Sportvision created the technology that superimposes an ad on the glass at each end of the rink.

During the 2016 World Cup of Hockey, which is organized by the NHL, the league worked with the British company Supponor to allow each broadcaster to substitute their own advertisements on the dasher boards. At the 2020 All-Star Game, the NHL produced nine localized feeds, each with its own advertising, using DED.

Beginning with the 2022–23 season, the NHL deployed DED league-wide for all games. Each game has 120 ad increments of 30 seconds, across five zones, on feeds for the home team, the away team, and a feed for international use; the NHL also has a "clean" feed, with no digital modification to the boards. Gary Bettman, the NHL's commissioner, predicted that the DED would increase revenue for the league and its member clubs.

According to SponsorUnited, which tracks sports sponsorship data, the DED contributed to a 21% increase in sponsorship revenue year-over-year during the 2022–23 season. Seven hundred brands participated in the virtual advertising program.

== Awards ==
The DED program was nominated for the George Wensel Technical Achievement Award at the 2023 Sports Emmy Awards.

Sports Business Journal gave the NHL its Sports Breakthrough of the Year award in 2023 for digitally enhanced dasherboards.

== Criticism ==
Early in the 2022–23 season, many fans and journalists were dissatisfied with the digitally enhanced dasherboards, finding the match moving technology to be glitchy and distracting. Greg Wyshynski observed that the physical dasherboard ads were still visible in reflections on the ice. The DED frequently "ate" pucks that got close to the boards, and the ad substitution created a video delay, causing announcers to seem to react to events that television viewers had not yet seen. In response to criticism, the NHL adjusted the brightness of the DED ads.

Keith Wachtel, the NHL's chief business officer and executive vice president of global partnerships, told ESPN that many fans appreciated the cleaner look of the DED when watching hockey telecasts.
