= 2022–23 NHL season =

National Hockey League season

- League: National Hockey League
- Sport: Ice hockey
- Duration: October 7, 2022 – June 13, 2023
- Games: 82
- Teams: 32
- TV partner(s): Sportsnet/SN1/SN360, Citytv, CBC, TVA Sports (Canada); ESPN/ABC/ESPN2, TNT/TBS (United States)
- Streaming partner(s): Sportsnet Now (Canada); ESPN+/Hulu (United States)

Draft
- Top draft pick: Juraj Slafkovsky
- Picked by: Montreal Canadiens

Regular season
- Presidents' Trophy: Boston Bruins
- Season MVP: Connor McDavid (Oilers)
- Top scorer: Connor McDavid (Oilers)

Playoffs
- Playoffs MVP: Jonathan Marchessault (Golden Knights)

Stanley Cup
- Champions: Vegas Golden Knights
- Runners-up: Florida Panthers

NHL seasons
- 2021–22 2023–24

The 2022–23 NHL season was the 106th season of operation (105th season of play) of the National Hockey League (NHL). The regular season began on October 7, 2022, when the San Jose Sharks and the Nashville Predators played the first of two games in Prague, Czech Republic as a part of the 2022 NHL Global Series.

The playoffs concluded on June 13, with the Vegas Golden Knights defeating the Florida Panthers in the Stanley Cup Final in five games, winning their first Stanley Cup in franchise history.

== League business ==
=== Sponsorships ===
In addition to sponsor logos on helmets (helmet entitlement partner), teams were allowed to also sell another sponsor placement on their players' jerseys (jersey patch partner) this season. The jersey sponsor patches had to be no greater than 3 by 3 1/2 inches (7.62 cm × 8.89 cm).

The following teams announced their jersey sponsors:

- Arizona: Gila River Resort & Casino (home)
- Boston: Rapid7
- Columbus: Safelite
- Florida: AutoNation (away)
- Minnesota: TRIA
- Montreal: RBC (home)
- Pittsburgh: Highmark (home)
- St. Louis: Stifel
- Toronto: Dairy Farmers of Ontario (Note: The sponsor patch features the Dairy Farmers of Ontario's "Milk" logo.)
- Vancouver: TD Bank (home)
- Vegas: Circa Las Vegas (home)
- Washington: Caesars Sportsbook (home)
- Winnipeg: Canada Life

=== Digital rink board advertisements ===
After previous trials during the 2016 World Cup of Hockey and 2020 NHL All-Star Game, the NHL deployed digitally enhanced dasherboards, using Supponor technology, at all arenas this season. This allows the digital replacement and insertion of advertising on the rink boards on selected camera angles, which can be localized for individual regional, national, and international broadcasters. These advertising units include logo placements similar to the boards seen in person (which will still be shown on camera angles that do not support ad replacement), and larger "zone"-based units across sections of the boards, or the entire board.

=== Entry draft ===
The 2022 NHL entry draft was held on July 7–8, 2022, at the Bell Centre in Montreal, the home of the Montreal Canadiens. Juraj Slafkovsky was selected first overall by the Canadiens.

=== Preseason games in Europe ===
The league held preseason games in Europe for the first time since 2019. The Nashville Predators played SC Bern at PostFinance Arena in Bern, Switzerland, on October 3, 2022. The San Jose Sharks played Eisbaren Berlin at Mercedes-Benz Arena in Berlin, Germany, on October 4.

== Coaching changes ==
Coaching changes
Off–season
Team	2021–22 coach	2022–23 coach	Notes
Boston Bruins	Bruce Cassidy	Jim Montgomery	Cassidy was fired on June 6, 2022, several weeks after the Bruins' elimination from the 2022 Stanley Cup playoffs. Cassidy compiled a 245–108–46 record in six seasons with Boston, winning the Jack Adams Trophy in 2019–20 and reaching the playoffs every year of his tenure; additionally, Boston won the Presidents' Trophy in 2019–20, and advanced to the Stanley Cup Final in 2019. Montgomery, most recently an assistant coach with the St. Louis Blues, and previously head coach of the Dallas Stars from 2018 to 2019, was named head coach on July 1, 2022.
Chicago Blackhawks	Jeremy Colliton; Derek King*	Luke Richardson	Colliton was fired on November 6, 2021, after parts of four seasons with Chicago, with the team starting the season 1–9–2. In his tenure, Colliton compiled a 87–92–26 record and led the team to the first round of the playoffs in 2020. King, previously the head coach of the Blackhawks' American Hockey League (AHL) affiliate Rockford IceHogs, was promoted to interim head coach. King finished out the season 27–33–10, failing to reach the playoffs. Richardson, formerly an assistant coach with the Montreal Canadiens, was named head coach on June 27, 2022.
Dallas Stars	Rick Bowness	Peter DeBoer	On May 20, 2022, five days after the Stars were eliminated from the 2022 Stanley Cup playoffs, and with his contract expiring, Bowness resigned as head coach of the Stars. In two and a half seasons with Dallas, Bowness recorded an 89–62–25 record, reaching the Stanley Cup Final in 2020. DeBoer, who most recently served as head coach of the Vegas Golden Knights from 2020 to 2022, and who had been fired by Vegas one month prior, was named head coach on June 21, 2022.
Detroit Red Wings	Jeff Blashill	Derek Lalonde	On April 30, 2022, a day after the Red Wings season finished, it was announced that Blashill's contract would not be renewed. Blashill was 204–261–72 in seven seasons with the Red Wings and made the playoffs once in his tenure. Lalonde, formerly an assistant coach with the Tampa Bay Lightning, was named head coach on June 30, 2022.
Florida Panthers	Joel Quenneville; Andrew Brunette*	Paul Maurice	Quenneville resigned on October 28, 2021, after the results of an internal investigation revealed that he had improperly handled an accusation of sexual assault during his tenure as head coach of the Chicago Blackhawks in 2010. Quenneville totaled a 79–40–13 record in just over two seasons with the Panthers, reaching the playoffs twice but failing to advance past the first round. Assistant coach Brunette was named interim head coach. Brunette finished out the season 51–18–6, with Florida winning the Presidents' Trophy and making it to the second round of the playoffs. Maurice, most recently the head coach of the Winnipeg Jets from 2013 to 2021, was then named permanent head coach on June 22, 2022.
Montreal Canadiens	Dominique Ducharme; Martin St. Louis*	Martin St. Louis	Ducharme was fired on February 9, 2022, after the Canadiens began the season 8–30–7, with the team last in the league at his time of departure. In his brief tenure over parts of two seasons, Ducharme registered a 23–46–14 record, reaching the Stanley Cup Final in 2021. St. Louis was named interim head coach later in the day, before being promoted to permanent head coach on June 1, 2022.
New York Islanders	Barry Trotz	Lane Lambert	Trotz was fired on May 9, 2022, 10 days after the conclusion of the Islanders' season. Trotz registered a 152–102–34 record in four seasons with New York, reaching the third round of the playoffs in back-to-back years. Lambert, previously an assistant coach under Trotz, was named head coach on May 16.
Philadelphia Flyers	Alain Vigneault; Mike Yeo*	John Tortorella	Vigneault was fired on December 6, 2021, after the Flyers began the season 8–10–4. Vigneault compiled a 74–54–19 record in just over two seasons with Philadelphia, reaching the second round of the playoffs in 2020. Assistant coach Yeo was retained and named interim head coach; he finished out with a record of 17–36–7, before being fired on May 3, 2022, after the conclusion of the season. Tortorella, most recently head coach of the Columbus Blue Jackets from 2015 to 2021, was named head coach on June 17.
San Jose Sharks	Bob Boughner	David Quinn	Boughner was fired on July 1, 2022, two months after the conclusion of the Sharks' season. In two and a half seasons with San Jose, Boughner totaled a 67–85–23 record, failing to record a playoff appearance. Quinn, most recently head coach of the New York Rangers from 2018 to 2021, was named head coach on July 26.
Vegas Golden Knights	Peter DeBoer	Bruce Cassidy	DeBoer was fired on May 16, 2022, 16 days after the conclusion of the Golden Knights' season. DeBoer registered a 98–50–12 record in just over two seasons with Vegas, reaching the third round of the playoffs in back-to-back years. Cassidy, most recently head coach of the Boston Bruins from 2016 to 2022, and who had been fired by Boston one week prior, was named head coach on June 14.
Winnipeg Jets	Paul Maurice; Dave Lowry*	Rick Bowness	Maurice resigned on December 17, 2021, after the Jets started the season 13–10–5. In just under eight and a half seasons with Winnipeg, Maurice totaled a 315–223–62 record, with five playoff appearances. Assistant coach Lowry was named interim head coach. Lowry finished the season 26–22–6, failing to reach the playoffs. Bowness, most recently head coach of the Dallas Stars from 2019 to 2022, and who had briefly coached the original Jets during the 1988–89 season, was named head coach on July 3, 2022.
In–season
Team	Outgoing coach	Incoming coach	Notes
Vancouver Canucks	Bruce Boudreau	Rick Tocchet	Boudreau was fired on January 22, 2023, after the Canucks started the season 18–25–3. During parts of two seasons with the team, Boudreau totaled a 50–40–13 record, missing the playoffs in 2022. Tocchet, most recently head coach of the Arizona Coyotes from 2017 to 2021, was named head coach the same day.

(*) Indicates interim.

== Front office changes ==
General managers
Off–season
Team	2021–22 general manager	2022–23 general manager	Notes
Colorado Avalanche	Joe Sakic	Chris MacFarland	Sakic was promoted to president of hockey operations on July 11, 2022. MacFarland, formerly an assistant general manager, assumed the role of general manager.
San Jose Sharks	Doug Wilson; Joe Will*	Mike Grier	Wilson resigned on April 7, 2022, for medical reasons, with the Sharks holding a record of 29–31–9. Wilson had served as general manager of the Sharks since 2003, overseeing fourteen playoff appearances, five Pacific Division titles, one Presidents' Trophy, and one Stanley Cup Final appearance. Will, the assistant general manager at the time, assumed the role of interim general manager. Grier, a former player and most recently a hockey operations advisor with the New York Rangers, was named general manager on July 5, 2022. With his hiring, he became the first African-American general manager in NHL history.
In–season
Team	Outgoing general manager	Incoming general manager	Notes
Philadelphia Flyers	Chuck Fletcher	Daniel Briere*	Fletcher was fired on March 10, 2023, with the Flyers holding a record of 24–30–11. Fletcher served as general manager since 2018 with the team making the playoffs once. Briere, the assistant general manager, was promoted to interim general manager.

(*) Indicates interim.

== Arena changes ==
- The Arizona Coyotes signed a three-year agreement to play at Mullett Arena on the campus of Arizona State University in Tempe, Arizona. The team's previous home Gila River Arena chose not to renew their lease agreement, and ASU's arena was a temporary transitional venue while the Coyotes explored the construction of a new venue before the team's hockey assets were sold to a group from Salt Lake City.

== Regular season ==
The regular season began on October 7, 2022, and ended April 14, 2023. Sixteen NHL games were played on the same day for the first time on April 8, 2023.

=== International games ===
The league held regular season games in Europe for the first time since the 2019–20 season. The Nashville Predators and San Jose Sharks played their first two regular season games against each other on October 7 and 8, 2022, at O2 Arena in Prague, Czech Republic. Then, the Columbus Blue Jackets and Colorado Avalanche played two games on November 4 and 5, at Nokia Arena in Tampere, Finland.

=== Outdoor games ===
The league held the following outdoor games:

- The Winter Classic was held on January 2, 2023, at Fenway Park in Boston, with the Boston Bruins hosting the Pittsburgh Penguins.
- The Stadium Series was held on February 18, 2023, at Carter–Finley Stadium in Raleigh, North Carolina, with the Carolina Hurricanes hosting the Washington Capitals.

=== All-Star Game ===
The 2023 All-Star Game took place on February 4, 2023, at FLA Live Arena in Sunrise, Florida, the home of the Florida Panthers.

=== Postponed games ===
- Two Nashville Predators home games, against Colorado on November 25 and Columbus on November 26, were postponed due to damage caused by a broken water main at Bridgestone Arena. The one against Columbus was rescheduled to January 17, and the one against Colorado was rescheduled to April 14 (the day after the regular season was originally scheduled to end).
- Due to a severe winter storm, two December 23 games were postponed. The Detroit Red Wings–Ottawa Senators game was rescheduled to February 27. The Tampa Bay Lightning–Buffalo Sabres game was moved to March 4, replacing the originally scheduled Philadelphia Flyers–Buffalo game, which was rescheduled to January 9. With Buffalo Niagara International Airport remaining closed due to a travel ban out of the area, the Buffalo–Columbus game on December 27 was also postponed, and it was rescheduled to April 14.

== Standings ==
=== Eastern Conference ===
Top 3 (Metropolitan Division)
Pos	Team	GP	W	L	OTL	RW	GF	GA	GD	Pts
1	y – Carolina Hurricanes	82	52	21	9	39	266	213	+53	113
2	x – New Jersey Devils	82	52	22	8	39	291	226	+65	112
3	x – New York Rangers	82	47	22	13	37	277	219	+58	107

Source: National Hockey League
Rules for classification: 1) Fewer number of games played (GP, only during regular season); 2) Greater number of regulation wins (RW); 3) Greater number of wins in regulation and overtime, excluding shootout wins (ROW); 4) Greater number of total wins, including shootouts (W); 5) Greater number of points earned in head-to-head play; if teams played an uneven number of head-to-head games, the result of the first game on the home ice of the team with the extra home game is discarded; 6) Greater goal differential (GD); 7) Greater number of goals scored (GF)
x – Clinched playoff spot; y – Clinched division

Top 3 (Atlantic Division)
Pos	Team	GP	W	L	OTL	RW	GF	GA	GD	Pts
1	p – Boston Bruins	82	65	12	5	54	305	177	+128	135
2	x – Toronto Maple Leafs	82	50	21	11	42	279	222	+57	111
3	x – Tampa Bay Lightning	82	46	30	6	38	283	254	+29	98

Source: National Hockey League
Rules for classification: 1) Fewer number of games played (GP, only during regular season); 2) Greater number of regulation wins (RW); 3) Greater number of wins in regulation and overtime, excluding shootout wins (ROW); 4) Greater number of total wins, including shootouts (W); 5) Greater number of points earned in head-to-head play; if teams played an uneven number of head-to-head games, the result of the first game on the home ice of the team with the extra home game is discarded; 6) Greater goal differential (GD); 7) Greater number of goals scored (GF)
p – Clinched Presidents' Trophy; x – Clinched playoff spot

Eastern Conference Wild Card
Pos	Div	Team	GP	W	L	OTL	RW	GF	GA	GD	Pts
1	ME	x – New York Islanders	82	42	31	9	36	243	222	+21	93
2	AT	x – Florida Panthers	82	42	32	8	36	290	273	+17	92
3	ME	Pittsburgh Penguins	82	40	31	11	31	262	264	−2	91
4	AT	Buffalo Sabres	82	42	33	7	30	296	300	−4	91
5	AT	Ottawa Senators	82	39	35	8	31	261	271	−10	86
6	AT	Detroit Red Wings	82	35	37	10	28	240	279	−39	80
7	ME	Washington Capitals	82	35	37	10	27	255	265	−10	80
8	ME	Philadelphia Flyers	82	31	38	13	26	222	277	−55	75
9	AT	Montreal Canadiens	82	31	45	6	21	232	307	−75	68
10	ME	Columbus Blue Jackets	82	25	48	9	15	214	330	−116	59

Source: National Hockey League
Rules for classification: 1) Fewer number of games played (GP, only during regular season); 2) Greater number of regulation wins (RW); 3) Greater number of wins in regulation and overtime, excluding shootout wins (ROW); 4) Greater number of total wins, including shootouts (W); 5) Greater number of points earned in head-to-head play; if teams played an uneven number of head-to-head games, the result of the first game on the home ice of the team with the extra home game is discarded; 6) Greater goal differential (GD); 7) Greater number of goals scored (GF)
x – Clinched playoff spot

=== Western Conference ===
Top 3 (Central Division)
Pos	Team	GP	W	L	OTL	RW	GF	GA	GD	Pts
1	y – Colorado Avalanche	82	51	24	7	36	280	226	+54	109
2	x – Dallas Stars	82	47	21	14	39	285	218	+67	108
3	x – Minnesota Wild	82	46	25	11	34	246	225	+21	103

Source: National Hockey League
Rules for classification: 1) Fewer number of games played (GP, only during regular season); 2) Greater number of regulation wins (RW); 3) Greater number of wins in regulation and overtime, excluding shootout wins (ROW); 4) Greater number of total wins, including shootouts (W); 5) Greater number of points earned in head-to-head play; if teams played an uneven number of head-to-head games, the result of the first game on the home ice of the team with the extra home game is discarded; 6) Greater goal differential (GD); 7) Greater number of goals scored (GF)
x – Clinched playoff spot; y – Clinched division

Top 3 (Pacific Division)
Pos	Team	GP	W	L	OTL	RW	GF	GA	GD	Pts
1	z – Vegas Golden Knights	82	51	22	9	38	272	229	+43	111
2	x – Edmonton Oilers	82	50	23	9	45	325	260	+65	109
3	x – Los Angeles Kings	82	47	25	10	37	280	257	+23	104

Source: National Hockey League
Rules for classification: 1) Fewer number of games played (GP, only during regular season); 2) Greater number of regulation wins (RW); 3) Greater number of wins in regulation and overtime, excluding shootout wins (ROW); 4) Greater number of total wins, including shootouts (W); 5) Greater number of points earned in head-to-head play; if teams played an uneven number of head-to-head games, the result of the first game on the home ice of the team with the extra home game is discarded; 6) Greater goal differential (GD); 7) Greater number of goals scored (GF)
x – Clinched playoff spot; z – Clinched conference

Western Conference Wild Card
Pos	Div	Team	GP	W	L	OTL	RW	GF	GA	GD	Pts
1	PA	x – Seattle Kraken	82	46	28	8	37	289	256	+33	100
2	CE	x – Winnipeg Jets	82	46	33	3	36	247	225	+22	95
3	PA	Calgary Flames	82	38	27	17	31	260	252	+8	93
4	CE	Nashville Predators	82	42	32	8	29	229	238	−9	92
5	PA	Vancouver Canucks	82	38	37	7	24	276	298	−22	83
6	CE	St. Louis Blues	82	37	38	7	27	263	301	−38	81
7	CE	Arizona Coyotes	82	28	40	14	20	228	299	−71	70
8	PA	San Jose Sharks	82	22	44	16	16	234	321	−87	60
9	CE	Chicago Blackhawks	82	26	49	7	18	204	301	−97	59
10	PA	Anaheim Ducks	82	23	47	12	13	209	338	−129	58

Source: National Hockey League
Rules for classification: 1) Fewer number of games played (GP, only during regular season); 2) Greater number of regulation wins (RW); 3) Greater number of wins in regulation and overtime, excluding shootout wins (ROW); 4) Greater number of total wins, including shootouts (W); 5) Greater number of points earned in head-to-head play; if teams played an uneven number of head-to-head games, the result of the first game on the home ice of the team with the extra home game is discarded; 6) Greater goal differential (GD); 7) Greater number of goals scored (GF)
x – Clinched playoff spot

== Playoffs ==
=== Bracket ===
In each round, teams compete in a best-of-seven series following a 2–2–1–1–1 format (scores in the bracket indicate the number of games won in each best-of-seven series). The team with home ice advantage plays at home for games one and two (and games five and seven, if necessary), and the other team is at home for games three and four (and game six, if necessary). The top three teams in each division make the playoffs, along with two wild cards in each conference, for a total of eight teams from each conference.

In the First Round, the lower seeded wild card in each conference played against the division winner with the best record while the other wild card played against the other division winner, and both wild cards were de facto #4 seeds. The other series matched the second and third place teams from the divisions. In the first two rounds, home ice advantage was awarded to the team with the better seed. In the conference final and Stanley Cup Final, home ice advantage was awarded to the team with the better regular season record.

First round	Second round
A1	Boston	3
WC2	Florida	4
WC2	Florida	4
A2	Toronto	1
A2	Toronto	4
A3	Tampa Bay	2
Eastern Conference
M1	Carolina	4
WC1	NY Islanders	2
M1	Carolina	4
M2	New Jersey	1
M2	New Jersey	4
M3	NY Rangers	3
C1	Colorado	3
WC1	Seattle	4
WC1	Seattle	3
C2	Dallas	4
C2	Dallas	4
C3	Minnesota	2
Western Conference
P1	Vegas	4
WC2	Winnipeg	1
P1	Vegas	4
P2	Edmonton	2
P2	Edmonton	4
P3	Los Angeles	2

Conference finals
WC2	Florida	4
M1	Carolina	0
C2	Dallas	2
P1	Vegas	4

Stanley Cup Final
WC2	Florida	1
P1	Vegas	4

== Statistics ==
=== Scoring leaders ===
The following players led the league in regular season points at the completion of games played on April 14, 2023.

Player	Team	GP	G	A	Pts	+/–	PIM
Connor McDavid	Edmonton Oilers	82	64	89	153	+22	36
Leon Draisaitl	Edmonton Oilers	80	52	76	128	+7	24
David Pastrnak	Boston Bruins	82	61	52	113	+34	38
Nikita Kucherov	Tampa Bay Lightning	82	30	83	113	–2	36
Nathan MacKinnon	Colorado Avalanche	71	42	69	111	+29	30
Jason Robertson	Dallas Stars	82	46	63	109	+37	20
Matthew Tkachuk	Florida Panthers	79	40	69	109	+29	123
Mikko Rantanen	Colorado Avalanche	82	55	50	105	+15	82
Ryan Nugent-Hopkins	Edmonton Oilers	82	37	67	104	+12	35
Elias Pettersson	Vancouver Canucks	80	39	63	102	+16	14

=== Leading goaltenders ===
The following goaltenders led the league in regular season goals against average at the completion of games played on April 13, 2023, while playing at least 1,920 minutes.

Player	Team	GP	TOI	W	L	OTL	GA	SO	SV%	GAA
Linus Ullmark	Boston Bruins	49	2,882:12	40	6	1	91	2	.938	1.89
Filip Gustavsson	Minnesota Wild	39	2,310:56	22	9	7	81	3	.931	2.10
Jeremy Swayman	Boston Bruins	37	2,012:59	24	6	4	76	4	.920	2.27
Ilya Samsonov	Toronto Maple Leafs	42	2,475:36	27	10	5	96	4	.919	2.33
Ilya Sorokin	New York Islanders	62	3,587:04	31	22	7	140	6	.924	2.34
Jake Oettinger	Dallas Stars	62	3,644:53	37	11	11	144	5	.919	2.37
Vitek Vanecek	New Jersey Devils	52	2,915:34	33	11	4	119	3	.911	2.45
Igor Shesterkin	New York Rangers	58	3,488:46	37	13	8	144	3	.916	2.48
Frederik Andersen	Carolina Hurricanes	34	1,984:21	21	11	1	82	1	.903	2.48
Connor Hellebuyck	Winnipeg Jets	64	3,778:00	37	25	2	157	4	.920	2.49

== NHL awards ==
Voting concluded immediately after the end of the regular season. Statistics-based awards such as the Art Ross Trophy, Maurice "Rocket" Richard Trophy, William M. Jennings Trophy and the Presidents' Trophy are announced at the end of the regular season. The Stanley Cup and the Conn Smythe Trophy are presented at the end of the Stanley Cup Final. The Jim Gregory General Manager of the Year Award is presented during the NHL entry draft.

2022–23 NHL awards
Award	Recipient(s)	Runner(s)-up/Finalists
Presidents' Trophy (Best regular-season record)	Boston Bruins	Carolina Hurricanes
Prince of Wales Trophy (Eastern Conference playoff champion)	Florida Panthers	Carolina Hurricanes
Clarence S. Campbell Bowl (Western Conference playoff champion)	Vegas Golden Knights	Dallas Stars
Art Ross Trophy (Player with most points)	Connor McDavid (Edmonton Oilers)	Leon Draisaitl (Edmonton Oilers)
Bill Masterton Memorial Trophy (Perseverance, sportsmanship, and dedication)	Kris Letang (Pittsburgh Penguins)	Clayton Keller (Arizona Coyotes); Alex Stalock (Chicago Blackhawks)
Calder Memorial Trophy (Best first-year player)	Matty Beniers (Seattle Kraken)	Owen Power (Buffalo Sabres); Stuart Skinner (Edmonton Oilers)
Conn Smythe Trophy (Most valuable player, playoffs)	Jonathan Marchessault (Vegas Golden Knights)	Jack Eichel (Vegas Golden Knights)
Frank J. Selke Trophy (Best defensive forward)	Patrice Bergeron (Boston Bruins)	Nico Hischier (New Jersey Devils); Mitch Marner (Toronto Maple Leafs)
Hart Memorial Trophy (Most valuable player, regular season)	Connor McDavid (Edmonton Oilers)	David Pastrnak (Boston Bruins); Matthew Tkachuk (Florida Panthers)
Jack Adams Award (Best coach)	Jim Montgomery (Boston Bruins)	Dave Hakstol (Seattle Kraken); Lindy Ruff (New Jersey Devils)
James Norris Memorial Trophy (Best defenseman)	Erik Karlsson (San Jose Sharks)	Adam Fox (New York Rangers); Cale Makar (Colorado Avalanche)
King Clancy Memorial Trophy (Leadership and humanitarian contribution)	Mikael Backlund (Calgary Flames)	Anders Lee (New York Islanders); Darnell Nurse (Edmonton Oilers)
Lady Byng Memorial Trophy (Sportsmanship and excellence)	Anze Kopitar (Los Angeles Kings)	Jack Hughes (New Jersey Devils); Brayden Point (Tampa Bay Lightning)
Ted Lindsay Award (Outstanding player)	Connor McDavid (Edmonton Oilers)	Erik Karlsson (San Jose Sharks); David Pastrnak (Boston Bruins)
Mark Messier Leadership Award (Leadership and community activities)	Steven Stamkos (Tampa Bay Lightning)	N/A
Maurice "Rocket" Richard Trophy (Top goal-scorer)	Connor McDavid (Edmonton Oilers)	David Pastrnak (Boston Bruins)
Jim Gregory General Manager of the Year Award (Top general manager)	Jim Nill (Dallas Stars)	Don Sweeney (Boston Bruins); Bill Zito (Florida Panthers)
Vezina Trophy (Best goaltender)	Linus Ullmark (Boston Bruins)	Connor Hellebuyck (Winnipeg Jets); Ilya Sorokin (New York Islanders)
William M. Jennings Trophy (Goaltender(s) of team with fewest goals against)	Jeremy Swayman and Linus Ullmark (Boston Bruins)	Frederik Andersen and Antti Raanta (Carolina Hurricanes)

=== All-Star teams ===
Position	First Team	Second Team	Position	All-Rookie
G	Linus Ullmark, Boston Bruins	Ilya Sorokin, New York Islanders	G	Stuart Skinner, Edmonton Oilers
D	Adam Fox, New York Rangers	Hampus Lindholm, Boston Bruins	D	Owen Power, Buffalo Sabres
D	Erik Karlsson, San Jose Sharks	Cale Makar, Colorado Avalanche	D	Jake Sanderson, Ottawa Senators
C	Connor McDavid, Edmonton Oilers	Leon Draisaitl, Edmonton Oilers	F	Matty Beniers, Seattle Kraken
RW	David Pastrnak, Boston Bruins	Matthew Tkachuk, Florida Panthers	F	Wyatt Johnston, Dallas Stars
LW	Jason Robertson, Dallas Stars	Artemi Panarin, New York Rangers	F	Matias Maccelli, Arizona Coyotes

== Uniforms ==
- On March 21, 2023, the NHL announced that Fanatics would become the new official apparel provider of the NHL beginning with the 2024–25 season, agreeing to a 10-year contract.

=== Wholesale team changes ===
- The Arizona Coyotes introduced a new "Desert Night" alternate, featuring the team's former maroon and sand colors and a new wordmark.
- The Buffalo Sabres introduced an updated version of the black bison head (known as the "goathead") jersey, originally introduced in 1996, as a third jersey for this season.
- The Calgary Flames introduced an all-black version of their 1998 third jersey as their new alternate jersey, similar to their 2020–21 Reverse Retro uniforms.
- The Carolina Hurricanes promoted their black alternate uniform to their primary home set. They also unveiled a throwback 1997 to 2007 red alternate in commemoration of the franchise's 25th anniversary in Carolina.
- The Columbus Blue Jackets changed their road pants to blue.
- The Edmonton Oilers changed their primary uniforms to the royal blue/orange/white set previously worn from 1981 to 1996, and from 2011 to 2017. The midnight blue alternates were retained.
- The San Jose Sharks unveiled new uniforms which were mainly inspired by the team's original 1991 to 1998 set. These uniforms also featured teal pants, gloves, and home helmets.
- The Vancouver Canucks unveiled a modernized version of their 1990s black/red/yellow "Flying Skate" uniforms as their new alternate jersey.
- The Vegas Golden Knights promoted their gold alternate jerseys to primary home jersey, as part of their "Golden Age" campaign.

=== "Reverse Retro" jerseys ===
Each NHL team wore "Reverse Retro" jerseys for select games during the 2020–21 season, utilizing a variety of uniform designs and color schemes from the teams' histories. After several months of speculation, the NHL formally announced the return of the "Reverse Retro" program for the 2022–23 season on October 19, 2022, with new designs. All 32 jerseys were formally revealed the next day on October 20, with all containing a vintage-styled orange and black NHL shield logo. The jerseys for the 2023 NHL All-Star Game, revealed in late January 2023, were also revealed to be part of the program.

League-wide

- All-Star Game: The same design as those used from the 1994 to 1997 All-Star Games, but recolored in black, teal, and pink, reflecting the South Florida setting of the game.

Metropolitan Division

- Carolina Hurricanes: The current away jersey, but in red with black stripes.
- Columbus Blue Jackets: The team's first third jersey in 2003, but in black with light blue stripes (the latter taken from their current third jerseys).
- New Jersey Devils: 1982 throwbacks, the team's first season after relocating from Denver, in Colorado Rockies colors. This jersey also commemorates the 40th anniversary of the team's relocation.
- New York Islanders: 1995 throwbacks featuring the infamous "Fisherman" logo, but with most of the teal removed and the wave pattern, numbers, and name bars simplified.
- New York Rangers: 1996 alternate jerseys that feature the head of the Statue of Liberty, similar to their first Reverse Retro, but now in royal blue with red sleeves.
- Philadelphia Flyers: 1975 throwbacks, commemorating the team's back-to-back Stanley Cup championships, but with the black and orange stripes swapped.
- Pittsburgh Penguins: 1992 throwbacks featuring the "robo-penguin" logo, except in black, similar to an unused concept from their 1992 rebrand.
- Washington Capitals: 1995 throwbacks featuring the "screaming eagle", except with the blue and black swapped; the "2005" in the collar commemorates Alexander Ovechkin's rookie year, rather than the year of the jersey.

Atlantic Division

- Boston Bruins: The team's first third jersey in 1995, featuring the "pooh bear" logo, but in white.
- Buffalo Sabres: 1996 "goathead" throwbacks, but in the team's current color scheme.
- Detroit Red Wings: The team's 1991 NHL 75th Anniversary jersey, but with a red base and black stripes.
- Florida Panthers: 1998 throwbacks, but with the secondary palm tree and hockey stick logo as the crest, on the powder blue from their 2009 third "JetBlue" jersey.
- Montreal Canadiens: 1979 throwbacks, but with red swapped with powder blue based on the Montreal Expos, Montreal's Major League Baseball team from 1969 to 2004. The year commemorates the Expos' introduction of Youppi!, who now serves as the Canadiens' mascot.
- Ottawa Senators: 2007 throwbacks, commemorating the franchise's trip to the Stanley Cup Final, but in a two-tone black and red, with the current main crest in place of the original 2007 one.
- Tampa Bay Lightning: The team's first third jersey from 1997, featuring the "storm" design, but now in white.
- Toronto Maple Leafs: 1962 throwbacks, but with blue and white inverted.

Central Division

- Arizona Coyotes: The team's first third jersey in 1999, similar to their first Reverse Retro, but now in burnt orange instead of the previous Reverse Retro's purple or the original green.
- Chicago Blackhawks: 1938 throwbacks, but with a "Chicago" wordmark in place of a crest, and the black and red inverted.
- Colorado Avalanche: 1995 throwbacks, but in the colors of the Colorado state flag, with a "C" crest also taken from the flag.
- Dallas Stars: 1993 throwbacks, but in black with victory green shoulders instead of white with black shoulders, and the logos featuring silver instead of gold.
- Minnesota Wild: Features the current Wild logo with the style and colors of the 1978 Minnesota North Stars jerseys, similar to their first Reverse Retro, but now primarily in green instead of white.
- Nashville Predators: The team's first third jersey in 2001, but with the primarily mustard-yellow color replaced by the team's current shade of gold.
- St. Louis Blues: 1966 prototype jerseys, but in gold instead of white.
- Winnipeg Jets: 1990 throwbacks, but in the team's current color scheme.

Pacific Division

- Anaheim Ducks: 1993 throwbacks, but in the team's current color scheme.
- Calgary Flames: 1995 "pedestal" throwbacks, but in black instead of white.
- Edmonton Oilers: The team's first third jersey in 2001, featuring the "oil drop gear" logo designed by artist and former Oilers co-owner Todd McFarlane, but with the silver trim replaced by orange.
- Los Angeles Kings: 1982 throwbacks commemorating the 40th anniversary of the Miracle on Manchester, but in white instead of gold.
- San Jose Sharks: 1974 California Golden Seals jerseys, but featuring a "Sharks" wordmark in place of "Seals", and striping colors inverted.
- Seattle Kraken: The 1951 jerseys of the Seattle Ironmen of the Pacific Coast Hockey League (PCHL), but with the Kraken crest and colors.
- Vancouver Canucks: 1962 Johnny Canuck throwbacks from the Western Hockey League (WHL) team of the same name, who became the NHL Canucks in 1970, with current colors.
- Vegas Golden Knights: A diagonal "Vegas" wordmark inspired by vintage signage from the Excalibur and Stardust casinos, and linked to the 1995 Las Vegas Thunder of the International Hockey League (IHL). The jersey also contains multiple glow-in-the-dark elements.

== Milestones ==
=== First games ===
The following is a list of notable players who played their first NHL game during the 2022–23 season, listed with their first team.

Player	Team	Notability
Juraj Slafkovsky	Montreal Canadiens	First overall pick in the 2022 draft

=== Last games ===
The following is a list of players of note who played their last NHL game in 2022–23, listed with their team:

Player	Team	Notability
Craig Anderson	Buffalo Sabres	Bill Masterton Memorial Trophy winner, over 300 wins, oldest active player in NHL at time of retirement
Patrice Bergeron	Boston Bruins	Hockey Hall of Fame inductee, over 1,200 games played, six-time Frank J. Selke Trophy winner, King Clancy Memorial Trophy winner, Mark Messier Leadership Award winner, NHL Foundation Player Award winner, three-time NHL All-Star, NHL 2010s All-Decade Team selection, member of the Triple Gold Club
Derick Brassard	Ottawa Senators	Over 1,000 games played
Alexander Edler	Los Angeles Kings	Over 1,000 games played, one-time NHL All-Star
Brian Elliott	Tampa Bay Lightning	William M. Jennings Trophy winner, two-time NHL All-Star
Thomas Greiss	St. Louis Blues	William M. Jennings Trophy winner
Jaroslav Halak	New York Rangers	Two-time William M. Jennings Trophy winner, one-time NHL All-Star
David Krejci	Boston Bruins	Over 1,000 games played
Wayne Simmonds	Toronto Maple Leafs	Over 1,000 games played, Mark Messier Leadership Award winner, one-time NHL All-Star
Eric Staal	Florida Panthers	Over 1,300 games played, one-time NHL All-Star team selection, six-time NHL All-Star, member of the Triple Gold Club
Paul Stastny	Carolina Hurricanes	Over 1,100 games played, one-time NHL All-Star
Jakub Voracek	Columbus Blue Jackets	Over 1,000 games played, one-time NHL All-Star team selection, one-time NHL All-Star

=== Major milestones reached ===
- On October 20, 2022, Minnesota Wild defenseman Alex Goligoski played his 1,000th NHL game, becoming the 371st player to reach the mark.
- On October 22, 2022, Nashville Predators general manager David Poile became the first-ever general manager to oversee 3,000 regular season NHL games.
- On October 25, 2022, Vegas Golden Knights forward Phil Kessel played his 990th consecutive NHL game, setting a new record for consecutive games played, and surpassing the record previously held by Keith Yandle.
- On October 28, 2022, New York Islanders forward Josh Bailey played his 1,000th NHL game, becoming the 372nd player to reach the mark.
- On November 5, 2022, Washington Capitals forward Alexander Ovechkin scored his 787th goal as a Capital, setting a new record for goals with one franchise, and surpassing the record previously held by Gordie Howe.
- On November 17, 2022, Vegas Golden Knights forward Phil Kessel became the first player in NHL history to play 1,000 consecutive games.
- On November 20, 2022, Pittsburgh Penguins forward Evgeni Malkin played his 1,000th NHL game, becoming the 373rd player to reach the mark.
- On November 21, 2022, Boston Bruins forward Patrice Bergeron recorded his 1,000th point, becoming the 94th player to reach the mark.
- On November 21, 2022, Colorado Avalanche defenseman Cale Makar recorded his 200th point in his 195th NHL game, becoming the fastest defenseman to 200 points in NHL history, and surpassing the record previously held by Sergei Zubov. Additionally, Makar became the first defenseman in NHL history to record 200 points in fewer than 200 games.
- On November 21, 2022, Nashville Predators general manager David Poile became the first-ever general manager to win 1,500 regular season NHL games.
- On November 21, 2022, New York Islanders forward Cal Clutterbuck recorded his 3,633rd hit, becoming the all-time leader in hits since the statistic began to be tracked, and surpassing the record previously held by Dustin Brown.
- On November 29, 2022, Seattle Kraken goaltender Martin Jones allowed eight goals in a 9–8 overtime win against the Los Angeles Kings, becoming the first goaltender to allow eight or more goals and record a victory since Mike Vernon in 1991.
- On November 29, 2022, Washington Capitals forward Alexander Ovechkin scored his 403rd road goal, setting a new record for road goals, and surpassing the record previously held by Wayne Gretzky.
- On December 1, 2022, Tampa Bay Lightning forward Steven Stamkos recorded his 1,000th point, becoming the 95th player to reach the mark.
- On December 7, 2022, Buffalo Sabres forward Tage Thompson scored five goals in one game, becoming the 48th player in NHL history to do so. Thompson also became the fourth player in league history to score four first-period goals in one game.
- On December 10, 2022, Detroit Red Wings forward David Perron played his 1,000th NHL game, becoming the 374th player to reach the mark.
- On December 13, 2022, Washington Capitals forward Alexander Ovechkin scored his 136th game-opening goal, setting a new record for game-opening goals, and surpassing the record previously held by Jaromir Jagr.
- On December 13, 2022, Washington Capitals forward Alexander Ovechkin scored his 800th goal, becoming the third player to reach the mark.
- On December 22, 2022, Washington Capitals forward Alexander Ovechkin registered his 6,210th shot on goal, setting a new record for shots on goal, and surpassing the record previously held by Ray Bourque.
- On December 23, 2022, Washington Capitals forward Alexander Ovechkin scored his 802nd goal, surpassing Gordie Howe (801) for second all-time in NHL goals.
- On December 29, 2022, Winnipeg Jets forward Sam Gagner played his 1,000th NHL game, becoming the 375th player to reach the mark.
- On December 31, 2022, Los Angeles Kings defenseman Alexander Edler played his 1,000th NHL game, becoming the 376th player to reach the mark.
- On January 14, 2023, Washington Capitals forward Alexander Ovechkin recorded his 17th 30-goal season, tying the league record for most 30-goal seasons held by Mike Gartner.
- On January 16, 2023, Boston Bruins forward David Krejci played his 1,000th NHL game, becoming the 377th player to reach the mark.
- On January 18, 2023, Tampa Bay Lightning forward Steven Stamkos scored his 500th career goal, becoming the 47th player to reach the mark.
- On January 29, 2023, Toronto Maple Leafs forward John Tavares played his 1,000th NHL game, becoming the 378th player to reach the mark.
- On February 6, 2023, Dallas Stars forward Jamie Benn played his 1,000th NHL game, becoming the 379th player to reach the mark.
- On February 25, 2023, Boston Bruins goaltender Linus Ullmark became the 13th goaltender in NHL history to score a goal in an NHL game.
- On February 26, 2023, Toronto Maple Leafs defenseman Mark Giordano blocked his 2,045th shot, becoming the all-time leader in blocked shots since the statistic began to be tracked, and surpassing the record previously held by Kris Russell.
- On March 1, 2023, Edmonton Oilers forward Connor McDavid scored two goals against the Toronto Maple Leafs, becoming the fifth player in NHL history to record multiple goals in five consecutive games.
- On March 2, 2023, Ottawa Senators forward Derick Brassard played his 1,000th NHL game, becoming the 380th player to reach the mark.
- On March 2, 2023, the Boston Bruins recorded their 100th point of the season in their 61st game, becoming the fastest team to 100 points in NHL history, and surpassing the record previously held by the 1976–77 Montreal Canadiens.
- On March 11, 2023, the Boston Bruins recorded their 50th win of the season in their 64th game, becoming the fastest team to 50 wins in NHL history, and surpassing the record previously held by both the 1995–96 Detroit Red Wings and 2018–19 Tampa Bay Lightning.
- On March 14, 2023, Edmonton Oilers forward Connor McDavid recorded his 129th point of the season, setting a new record for single-season points in the 21st century, and surpassing the record previously set by Nikita Kucherov in 2018–19.
- On March 21, 2023, Washington Capitals forward Alexander Ovechkin scored his 40th goal of the season, becoming his 13th 40-goal season, setting a new record for 40-goal seasons, and surpassing the record previously held by Wayne Gretzky.
- On March 21, 2023, New York Islanders general manager Lou Lamoriello became the second general manager to reach 1,400 NHL regular season wins, alongside David Poile.
- On March 22, 2023, Edmonton Oilers forward Connor McDavid scored his 60th goal of the season, becoming the 22nd player to reach the mark, and recording the 41st 60-goal season in NHL history.
- On April 1, 2023, Boston Bruins head coach Jim Montgomery led the Bruins to their 59th win of the season, setting a new record for wins by a head coach in their first year with a team, and surpassing the record previously set by Mike Babcock with the 2005–06 Detroit Red Wings.
- On April 2, 2023, Pittsburgh Penguins defenseman Kris Letang played his 1,000th NHL game, becoming the 381st player to reach the mark.
- On April 6, 2023, Tampa Bay Lightning forward Steven Stamkos played his 1,000th NHL game, becoming the 382nd player to reach the mark.
- On April 8, 2023, Pittsburgh Penguins forward Sidney Crosby recorded his 1,500th point, becoming the 15th player to reach the mark.
- On April 8, 2023, Edmonton Oilers forward Connor McDavid recorded his 150th point of the season, becoming the sixth player to reach the mark, and the first since Mario Lemieux in 1995–96.
- On April 9, 2023, Boston Bruins forward David Pastrnak scored his 60th goal of the season, becoming the 23rd player to reach the mark, and recording the 42nd 60-goal season in NHL history. In addition, Pastrnak and Connor McDavid became the first pair of players to score 60 goals in a season since Mario Lemieux and Jaromir Jagr did so in 1995–95.
- On April 9, 2023, the Boston Bruins recorded their 63rd win of the season, setting a new single-season record for wins, and surpassing the record previously held by both the 1995–96 Detroit Red Wings and 2018–19 Tampa Bay Lightning.
- On April 10, 2023, Ottawa Senators forward Claude Giroux recorded his 1,000th point, becoming the 96th player to reach the mark.
- On April 10, 2023, Dallas Stars forward Joe Pavelski recorded his 1,000th point, becoming the 97th player to reach the mark.
- On April 10, 2023, San Jose Sharks defenseman Erik Karlsson recorded his 100th point of the season, becoming the sixth defenseman to reach the mark, and the first since Brian Leetch in 1991–92.
- On April 11, 2023, the Boston Bruins recorded their 133rd point of the season, setting a new record for regular season points, and surpassing the record previously held by the 1976–77 Montreal Canadiens.
- On June 13, 2023, Vegas Golden Knights forward Mark Stone scored a hat trick in game 5 of the 2023 Stanley Cup Final, becoming the first player to score a hat trick in the Final since Peter Forsberg in 1996. Stone also became the first player to score a hat trick in a Stanley Cup-clinching game since Babe Dye in 1922, over 100 years before.

== Broadcast rights ==
=== National ===
==== Canada ====
This was the ninth season of the league's 12-year Canadian national broadcast rights deal with Sportsnet. This included Sportnet's sub-licensing agreements airing Saturday Hockey Night in Canada (HNIC) games on CBC Television and French-language broadcasts on TVA Sports. Sportsnet discontinued the Hometown Hockey format for its Monday-night national games and replaced it with Rogers Monday Night Hockey. Sportsnet's schedule included two special Friday editions of HNIC on January 13 and 27, and the Hockey Day in Canada games on January 21. Saturday HNIC games aired across CBC, one or more of the four Sportsnet feeds, Sportsnet One, Sportsnet 360, or Citytv; decisions on network assignments were made on a week-by-week basis, and select HNIC games were simulcast on multiple networks.

NHL Live, the digital streaming package for both national and out-of-market games, was discontinued. Out-of-market games were now streamed exclusively on Sportsnet Now Premium, albeit with reduced functionality with no home/away or radio broadcast features available. This followed the league's trend of moving out-of-market streaming rights directly onto a media partner's platform, after the previous season when ESPN+ took over the U.S. rights from the league's in-house NHL.tv.

==== United States ====
This was the second season of the league's seven-year U.S. national broadcast rights deals with the ESPN family of networks and Turner Sports.

ESPN aired exclusive regular season games on selected Tuesdays, Thursdays, and weekends. ABC continued to air games on selected Saturdays during the second half of the season. ESPN+ and Hulu exclusively streamed games throughout the season, primarily on most Tuesdays, Thursdays, and weekends. The All-Star Game and the Stadium Series was broadcast by ABC, while the All-Star skills competition aired on ESPN. NHL content on ESPN+, including out-of-market games, was rebranded under the blanket title "NHL Power Play on ESPN+". ESPN also collaborated with Disney Channel on a youth-oriented alternate broadcast of the Washington Capitals–New York Rangers game on March 14, 2023, using the player and puck tracking system to render a live, 3D animated version of the game portrayed by characters from its animated series Big City Greens.

Turner aired regular season games primarily on TNT, with TBS, truTV, and HLN being used as overflow. TNT primarily aired national games on Wednesday nights, along with the Thanksgiving Showdown, Winter Classic, and selected Sunday games during the later half of the season. Unlike the previous season, not all of TNT's games were exclusive broadcasts, and were thus subject to blackout.

NHL Network continues to nationally televise selected regular season games not broadcast by either ESPN or TNT. The network also produces its own game broadcasts on Saturday and Sunday afternoons as part of the NHL Network Showcase series.

=== Local ===
In September 2022, Ted Leonsis's Monumental Sports & Entertainment bought out NBCUniversal's ownership stake in NBC Sports Washington, which carries broadcasts of the Washington Capitals and the NBA's Washington Wizards, both Monumental-owned teams. Monumental initially took minority ownership of the network in 2016. NBC provided transitional corporate, technical, and distribution support up to 18 months after the sale, and Monumental plans to rebrand the network after the 2022–23 season.

On February 24, 2023, the AT&T SportsNet regional sports networks sent letters to the Pittsburgh Penguins and the Vegas Golden Knights saying they had until March 31, 2023, to reach an agreement to take their local television rights back. Warner Bros. Discovery, the owners of the networks, intends to leave the regional sports networks business. If a deal is not reached the networks would filed for Chapter 7 bankruptcy. The Seattle Kraken's deal with Root Sports Northwest is not affected because Warner Bros. Discovery only has minority control of that network.

On March 14, Diamond Sports Group, the operator of the Bally Sports regional sports networks, filed for Chapter 11 bankruptcy. Diamond plans to continue to broadcast games for the 12 NHL teams it has regional rights to while it plans to separate from majority parent Sinclair Broadcast Group as part of the reorganization.

=== Personnel ===
Hometown Hockey co-host Tara Slone left Sportsnet entirely after the format was discontinued.

The Chicago Blackhawks promoted Patrick Sharp to a full-time TV color commentator, splitting duties with Troy Murray. The team also announced that Colby Cohen and Caley Chelios contributed game analysis and other content on both TV and radio.

The New Jersey Devils hired Bill Spaulding as the team's new TV play-by-play announcer, replacing Steve Cangialosi.

The Seattle Kraken hired Eddie Olczyk as a TV color commentator, joining John Forslund and J. T. Brown on a three-person booth for a majority of games. Olczyk continued to hold the same position with TNT on a concurrent basis.

TSN analyst Mike Johnson replaced Ray Ferraro as a color commentator of the network's Toronto Maple Leafs broadcasts. Ferraro departed TSN to focus primarily on his duties as the lead color commentator on ESPN and ABC's NHL broadcasts in the United States.

The Winnipeg Jets hired Dan Robertson as the team's new TV play-by-play announcer, replacing Dennis Beyak.

=== International ===
After selling its stake in Disney Streaming, the NHL partnered with Sportradar (which had a ten-year deal with the league for data and video distribution) to assume the operations of its international streaming service NHL.tv.

== See also ==
- 2022–23 NHL transactions
- List of 2022–23 NHL Three Star Awards
- 2022–23 NHL suspensions and fines
- 2022 in sports
- 2023 in sports
