= Igor Shesterkin =

Russian ice hockey player (born 1995)

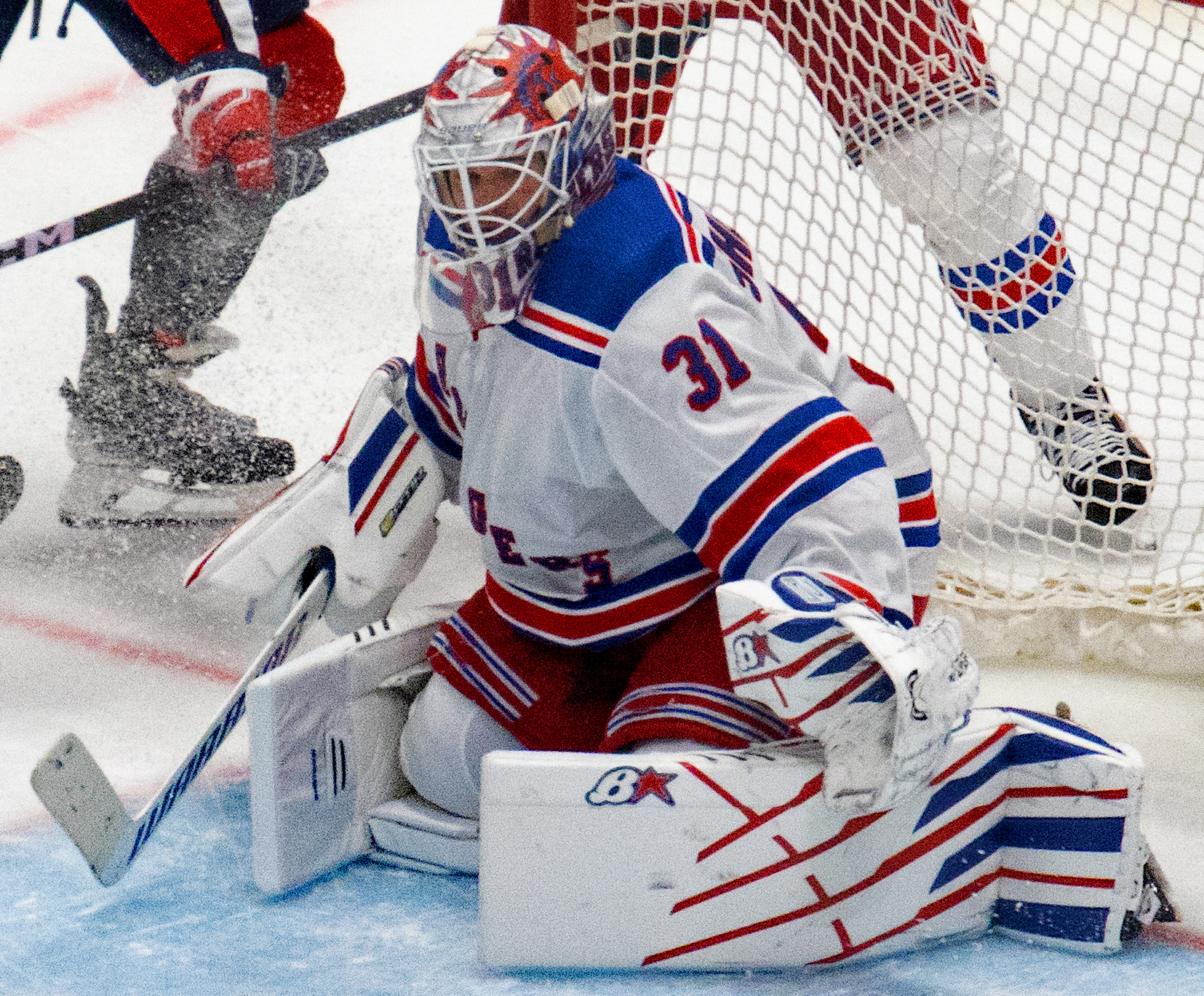
- Shesterkin with New York Rangers in April 2024
- Born: 30 December 1995 (age 30) Moscow, Russia
- Height: 6 ft 1 in (185 cm)
- Weight: 183 lb (83 kg; 13 st 1 lb)
- Position: Goaltender
- Catches: Left
- NHL team Former teams: New York Rangers; Spartak Moscow; SKA Saint Petersburg
- National team: Russia
- NHL draft: 118th overall, 2014; New York Rangers
- Playing career: 2014–present

Igor Olegovich Shestyorkin (Russian: Игорь Олегович Шестёркин, commonly spelled as Shesterkin; born 30 December 1995) is a Russian professional ice hockey player who is a goaltender for the New York Rangers of the National Hockey League (NHL). He was selected by the Rangers in the fourth round, 118th overall, of the 2014 NHL entry draft. In his first full NHL season in 2021–22, Shesterkin won the Vezina Trophy as the league's best goaltender.

== Playing career ==
=== KHL ===
Shesterkin played as a youth with Krylya Sovetov Moscow before he was selected by Spartak Moscow of the Kontinental Hockey League, 43rd overall in the 2012 KHL Draft, as a 16-year old. He played his first season within Spartak, at the MHL level, featuring for MHK Spartak in the 2012–13 season.

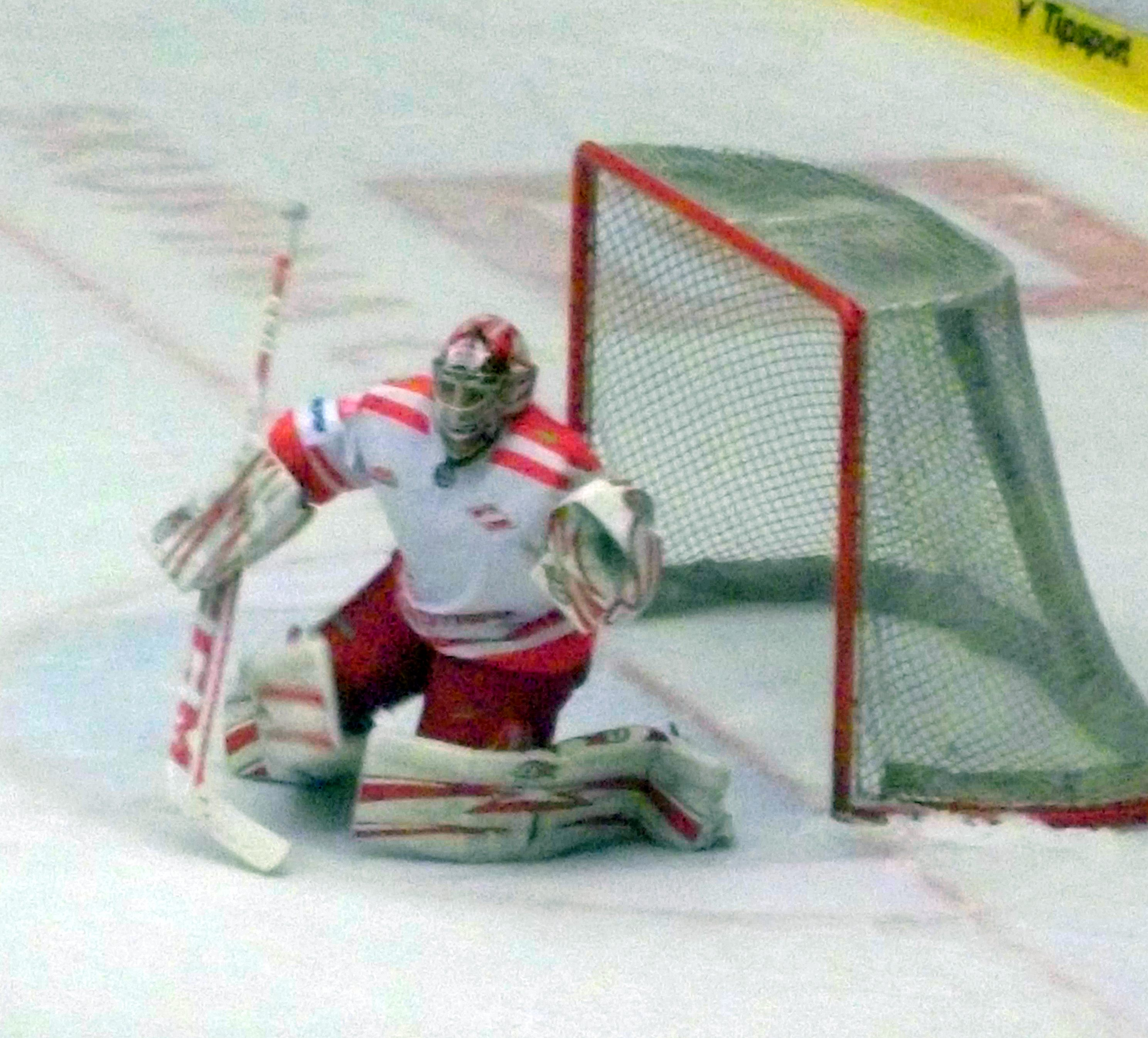
Shesterkin with Spartak Moscow in 2014

Shesterkin made his professional and KHL debut midway through the following 2013–14 season, recalled from MHK to close out the final 8 minutes for Spartak in relief of Alexei Ivanov in a 5–3 defeat to HC Ugra on 20 January 2014. He was given his first start three days later, allowing two goals in a 3–1 loss to Lokomotiv Yaroslavl on 23 January. In his eighth appearance, Shesterkin collected his first win, making 33 saves in a 3–0 shutout victory over HC Slovan Bratislava on 2 March. Returning the MHL, Shesterkin registered a 12–7 record in 19 playoff games, along with a 1.75 goals against averange and a .937 save percentage, and four shutouts to help MHK Spartak win the MHL Championship.

While out of contract from Spartak and showing strong potential, Shesterkin signed a contract with perennial powerhouse SKA Saint Petersburg on 6 June 2014. As the fifth-ranked goaltender entering the 2014 NHL entry draft, Shesterkin was selected in the fourth round, 118th overall, by the New York Rangers on 28 June.

=== NHL ===
==== 2019–2021: North American debut ====
On 3 May 2019, Shesterkin signed a two-year, entry-level contract with the New York Rangers. Shesterkin played in his first NHL preseason game on 21 September, stopping 36 of 40 shots in a 4–1 loss to the Philadelphia Flyers. He was assigned to the Hartford Wolf Pack, the Rangers' minor league affiliate team with the American Hockey League. Shesterkin made his AHL debut during Hartford's 2019–20 season opener on 5 October, during which he made 26 saves in a 5–3 win against the Charlotte Checkers. On 6 January 2020, the Rangers recalled Shesterkin after having success for the Wolf Pack with whom he posted a 15–4–3 record and was named to the 2020 AHL All-Star Classic. In his NHL debut with the Rangers on 7 January, Shesterkin made 29 saves in a 5–3 win against the Colorado Avalanche. Two days later, Shesterkin became the sixth Rangers' goaltender to win his first two games with the team. On 23 February 2020, Shesterkin and teammate Pavel Buchnevich were involved in a car crash. Shesterkin suffered a rib fracture following the incident.

On 13 April 2021, Shesterkin earned his first shutout of his NHL career in a 3–0 win against the New Jersey Devils. Subsequently, Shesterkin recorded his second career shutout in the next game against the Devils in a 4–0 contest on 15 April. He became the second Rangers rookie with back-to-back shutouts, and the first Ranger with back-to-back shutouts since Antti Raanta in December 2016. He also became the third Ranger in franchise history with shutouts versus the same opponent in consecutive games.

==== 2021–22: breakout and Eastern Conference final run ====
On 9 August 2021, Shesterkin signed a four-year, $22.67 million contract extension with the Rangers. On 18 October, Shesterkin made 40 out of 41 saves during a 2–1 overtime victory over the Toronto Maple Leafs. It was his seventh win with 40-plus saves since his NHL debut in January 2020; the most among all goaltenders during that time span. On 20 February 2022, after defeating the Ottawa Senators 2–1, Shesterkin became the 14th NHL goaltender with at least 50 wins in 79 starts. He concluded the 2021–22 regular season with a 36–13–4 record, leading the league in both save percentage and goals against average. Shesterkin was widely hailed as having had one of the finest showings for a goaltender in the history of the NHL. This attracted considerable speculation as to whether he should be a contender for the Hart Memorial Trophy as the league's most valuable player, seldom awarded to netminders. On 10 May, he was named as a finalist for the Vezina Trophy, awarded to the league's best goaltender. Two days later he was named as a Hart Trophy finalist, the first goaltender so honoured in five years. He ultimately won the Vezina and finished third in Hart voting.

The Rangers finished second in the Metropolitan Division, and in the opening round of the 2022 Stanley Cup playoffs faced the Pittsburgh Penguins, whose starting goaltender Tristan Jarry was sidelined by injury. In Game 1, Shesterkin's NHL playoff debut on 3 May, he made 79 saves in the 4–3 triple overtime loss, setting the all-time team record for saves in a playoff game, with the second most saves in a playoff game league-wide. Following a Rangers win in Game 2, the Rangers lost Games 3 and 4 by wide margins, with Shesterkin replaced by Alexandar Georgiev in the second period of each game. The Rangers subsequently rallied to win the next three games and clinch the series. In the next series against the Carolina Hurricanes, the Rangers rallied back from a 2–0 series deficit to win again in seven games. Shesterkin was again generally considered the difference-maker for his team, backstopping them to key wins when outshot. Shesterkin became the first goaltender in NHL history to have two assists in a playoff game in which his team faced elimination, and the fifth goaltender with two assists in a single playoff game, as well as the first Rangers goaltender with at least two assists in any game since Mike Richter in 1992.

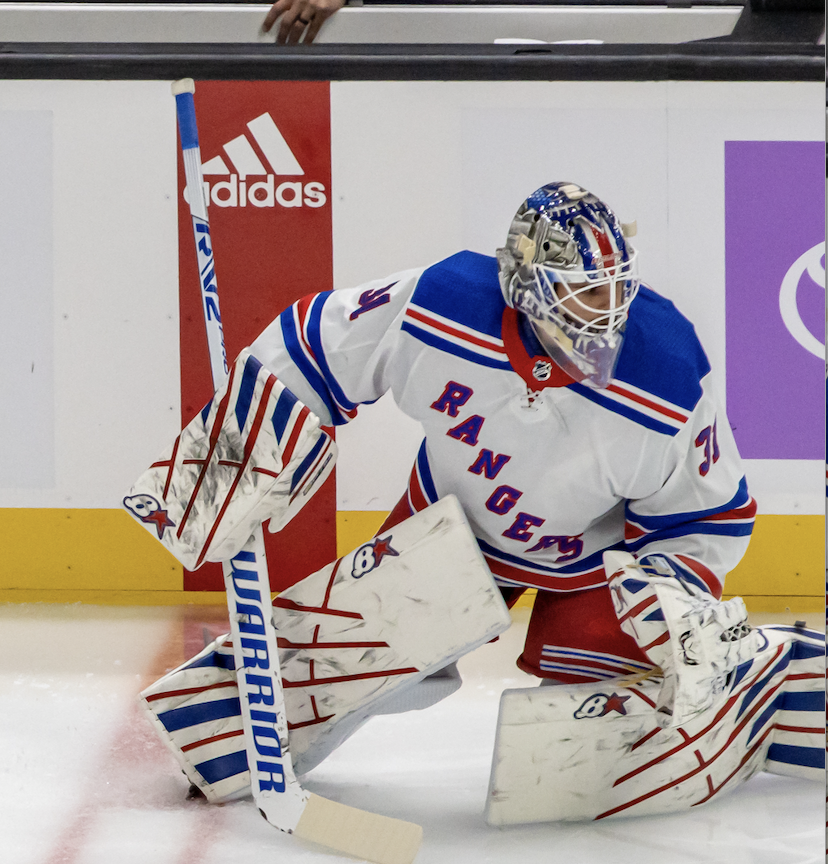
Shesterkin during warmups in November 2022.

The Rangers advanced to the Eastern Conference final for the first time since 2015, facing the two-time consecutive and defending Stanley Cup champion Tampa Bay Lightning. The contest with the Lightning was widely framed as a competition between Shesterkin and Lightning goaltender Andrei Vasilevskiy, the previous year's Conn Smythe Trophy winner for playoff MVP. Vasilevsky was considered by many, including Shesterkin himself, to be the best goaltender in the world. The Rangers ultimately lost to the Lightning in six games, while Shesterkin recorded a .929 save percentage over the course of the playoffs. Shesterkin was named a First Team All-Star after the end of the playoffs.

==== 2022–23: All-Star season ====
Shesterkin was selected to his first NHL All-Star Game in 2023, which made him the seventh goaltender in Rangers history to be an all-star (Chuck Rayner, Gump Worsley, Eddie Giacomin, Gilles Villemure, Mike Richter, and Henrik Lundqvist).

In the 2023 playoffs, the Rangers lost to the New Jersey Devils in seven games despite initially having a 2–0 series lead. However, Shesterkin was a bright spot as he posted a .931 save percentage and 1.96 goals-against average.

==== 2023–24: second All-Star season ====
On 12 October 2023, by winning the 2023–24 season opener against the Buffalo Sabres, Shesterkin became the fastest Rangers goaltender to reach 100 wins, doing so in only 159 outings. During a victory against the Carolina Hurricanes, Shesterkin suffered a "minor soreness" injury and missed a few games as a precaution, but returned against the New Jersey Devils. Earning an All-Star nod for the second consecutive season, Shesterkin became the sixth Rangers goaltender in franchise history to accomplish this milestone. He joins Henrik Lundqvist, Gilles Villemure, Eddie Giacomin, Gump Worsley, and Chuck Rayner.

==== 2025–26 season ====
During the 2025–26 season, he fought New Jersey Devils' goaltender Jacob Markström during the third period of a game on 31 March 2026. It was the third goaltender fight of the 2025–26 season.

==== 2026–27 season ====
On 1 October 2026, Shesterkin scored against the Tampa Bay Lightning, which was the first goaltender goal in Rangers team history, and the 18th by a different goaltender in NHL history.

On 9 October, in a game against the Washington Capitals, Shesterkin appeared to injure his right leg after jamming his skate into the goalpost, requiring help off the ice. The next day, it was announced that Shesterkin would be out for the remainder of the season. Shesterkin's brief season concluded with a 3–1–0 record, .927 save percentage, and 1.79 goals against average.

== International play ==
Medal record

Men's ice hockey

Representing Olympic Athletes from Russia

Winter Olympics
Gold medal – first place	2018 Pyeongchang	

Representing Russia

World Championships
Bronze medal – third place	2016 Russia	
Bronze medal – third place	2017 Germany/France	

World Junior Championships
Silver medal – second place	2015 Canada	

Shesterkin was a member of the Olympic Athletes from Russia team at the 2018 Winter Olympics. While capturing the gold medal, he did not see any action throughout the tournament as the nation's third goaltender.

Shesterkin represented Russia and was one of top goaltenders at the following 2018 World Championships in Denmark. He finished with two victories – both shutouts – and a 1.46 goals against average and a .942 save percentage, both of which were the third-best at the event.

== Career statistics ==
=== Regular season and playoffs ===
			Regular season									Playoffs
Season	Team	League	GP	W	L	T/OT	MIN	GA	SO	GAA	SV%	GP	W	L	MIN	GA	SO	GAA	SV%
2012–13	MHK Spartak	MHL	15	9	1	4	886	31	2	2.10	.920	9	6	3	529	14	3	1.59	.948
2013–14	MHK Spartak	MHL	23	14	5	4	1,399	33	5	1.42	.947	19	12	7	1,134	33	4	1.75	.937
2013–14	Spartak Moscow	KHL	9	1	5	2	428	20	1	2.80	.903	—	—	—	—	—	—	—	—
2014–15	SKA-1946	MHL	3	2	0	1	159	6	0	2.26	.934	13	7	6	778	32	1	2.47	.910
2014–15	SKA-Karelia	VHL	8	3	3	2	488	14	1	1.72	.943	—	—	—	—	—	—	—	—
2014–15	SKA Saint Petersburg	KHL	6	3	0	3	231	9	0	2.33	.917	—	—	—	—	—	—	—	—
2015–16	SKA-Neva	VHL	25	16	6	3	1,513	30	6	1.19	.954	—	—	—	—	—	—	—	—
2015–16	SKA Saint Petersburg	KHL	7	5	2	0	419	18	1	2.58	.912	—	—	—	—	—	—	—	—
2015–16	SKA-1946	MHL	2	1	1	0	119	3	0	1.51	.946	—	—	—	—	—	—	—	—
2016–17	SKA Saint Petersburg	KHL	39	27	4	6	2,191	60	8	1.64	.937	5	4	1	228	7	0	1.84	.940
2017–18	SKA Saint Petersburg	KHL	28	20	4	4	1,593	45	7	1.70	.933	1	0	0	1	0	0	0.00	1.000
2018–19	SKA Saint Petersburg	KHL	28	24	4	0	1,681	31	10	1.11	.953	10	4	5	522	17	0	1.95	.904
2019–20	Hartford Wolf Pack	AHL	25	17	4	3	1,455	46	3	1.90	.934	—	—	—	—	—	—	—	—
2019–20	New York Rangers	NHL	12	10	2	0	692	29	0	2.52	.932	1	0	1	58	3	0	3.10	.900
2020–21	New York Rangers	NHL	35	16	14	3	1,900	83	2	2.62	.916	—	—	—	—	—	—	—	—
2021–22	New York Rangers	NHL	53	36	13	4	3,071	106	6	2.07	.935	20	10	9	1,182	51	0	2.59	.929
2022–23	New York Rangers	NHL	58	37	13	8	3,489	144	3	2.48	.916	7	3	4	428	14	0	1.96	.931
2023–24	New York Rangers	NHL	55	36	17	2	3,277	141	4	2.58	.913	16	10	6	1,000	39	0	2.34	.926
2024–25	New York Rangers	NHL	61	27	29	5	3,505	167	6	2.86	.905	—	—	—	—	—	—	—	—
2025–26	New York Rangers	NHL	51	25	19	6	3,024	126	1	2.50	.912	—	—	—	—	—	—	—	—
2026–27	New York Rangers	NHL	5	3	1	0	267	9	0	1.79	.927	—	—	—	—	—	—	—	—
KHL totals			117	80	19	15	6,543	183	27	1.68	.935	16	8	6	751	24	0	1.91	.919
NHL totals			330	190	108	28	19,224	805	22	2.51	.917	44	23	20	2,668	107	0	2.41	.928

=== International ===
Year	Team	Event	Result	GP	W	L	OT	MIN	GA	SO	GAA	SV%
2012	Russia	IH18	5th	1	—	—	—	—	—	—	5.00	.821
2013	Russia	WJC18	4th	6	4	2	0	345	13	0	2.26	.937
2015	Russia	WJC	2nd place, silver medalist(s)	5	3	2	0	242	8	1	1.98	.938
2016	Russia	WC	3rd place, bronze medalist(s)	—	—	—	—	—	—	—	—	—
2017	Russia	WC	3rd place, bronze medalist(s)	—	—	—	—	—	—	—	—	—
2018	OAR	OG	1st place, gold medalist(s)	—	—	—	—	—	—	—	—	—
2018	Russia	WC	6th	4	2	0	1	205	5	2	1.46	.942
Senior totals				4	2	0	1	205	5	2	1.46	.942

== Awards and honours ==
Award	Year	Ref
KHL
All-Star Game	2017, 2018	
First All-Star Team	2017	
Gagarin Cup champion	2017	
AHL
All-Star Game	2020	
NHL
Vezina Trophy	2022	
First All-Star Team	2022	
All-Star Game	2023, 2024	

Awards and achievements
Preceded by Marc-André Fleury	Winner of the Vezina Trophy; 2022	Succeeded by Linus Ullmark
