= David Pastrňák =

Czech ice hockey player (born 1996)

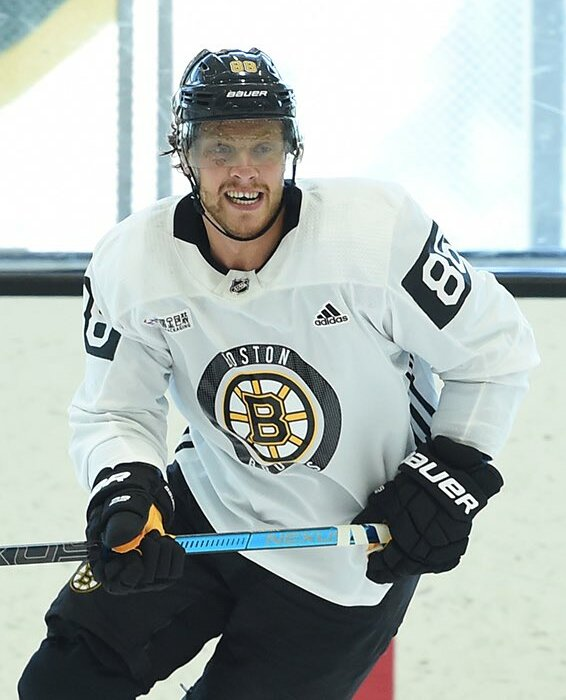
- Pastrňák with the Boston Bruins in 2019
- Born: 25 May 1996 (age 30) Havířov, Czech Republic
- Height: 6 ft 0 in (183 cm)
- Weight: 199 lb (90 kg; 14 st 3 lb)
- Position: Right wing
- Shoots: Right
- NHL team: Boston Bruins
- National team: Czech Republic
- NHL draft: 25th overall, 2014; Boston Bruins
- Playing career: 2014–present

David Pastrňák (Czech pronunciation: [ˈdavɪt ˈpastr̩ɲaːk]; born 25 May 1996) is a Czech professional ice hockey player who is a right winger and captain for the Boston Bruins of the National Hockey League (NHL). Nicknamed "Pasta", Pastrňák was selected by the Bruins in the first round, 25th overall, of the 2014 NHL entry draft and made his NHL debut that year. Internationally, Pastrňák has played for the Czech Republic national team at both the junior and senior level, including at four World Championships.

== Early life ==
David Pastrňák was born on 25 May 1996 in Havířov, Czech Republic, to father Milan Pastrňák and mother Marcela Ziembova. He first became interested in hockey through his father, who was a professional player and later a coach. He began skating when he was three years old. Milan left the family and moved to Karviná when Pastrňák was three years old, and after that Pastrňák spent weekends with his father. For most of his childhood, he lived with his mother and older brother in a two-bedroom apartment.

When he was 13 years old, Pastrňák got an agent and his hockey equipment was paid for; this reduced the financial stress on his family. At age 15, Pastrňák moved to the nearby town of Třinec, where he lived alone in a hotel room. This was considered a test to ensure that Pastrňák could move to Sweden the next year. During the 2011–12 season, Pastrňák led the Czech under-18 league in goals (41) and points (68). For the 2012–13 season, Pastrňák moved to Sweden to play for the junior squad of Södertälje SK. While in Södertälje, Pastrňák learned to speak English and Swedish, and started to watch NHL games for the first time. In May 2013, just before Pastrňák's 17th birthday, Milan died after a years-long battle with skin cancer. Grieving his father's death, Pastrňák intensified his training.

== Playing career ==
=== Södertälje SK ===
For the 2013–14 season, Pastrňák was promoted to Södertälje SK's senior team in Allsvenskan, Sweden's second-highest professional league. He led his team in points, scoring 8 goals and 16 assists in 36 games, though he missed part of the season due to a concussion.

=== Boston Bruins (2014–present) ===
==== Beginnings (2014–2016) ====
After being drafted by the Boston Bruins with the 25th pick overall in the 2014 NHL entry draft, Pastrňák signed a three-year, entry-level contract on 15 July 2014. Pastrňák attended the Bruins' training camp for the 2014–15 season before being assigned to the Providence Bruins, the team's American Hockey League (AHL) affiliate, on 7 October 2014. He made his NHL debut with the Bruins on 24 November, logging 7:53 of ice time in a 3–2 overtime loss to the Pittsburgh Penguins. He scored the first two goals of his NHL career against Ray Emery on 10 January 2015, as the initial pair of goals resulting in a 3–1 Bruins' road win over the Philadelphia Flyers. On 29 March, Pastrňák became the youngest Bruins' player in history to score an overtime, game-winning goal in regular season play in Boston's 2–1 road win over the Carolina Hurricanes. At the end of the season, he was one of just two players selected in the 2014 NHL Entry Draft to play in more than 40 NHL games during the 2014–15 season, and along with fellow Bruins' rookie Ryan Spooner, led the team in offense during the last 20 games of the season.

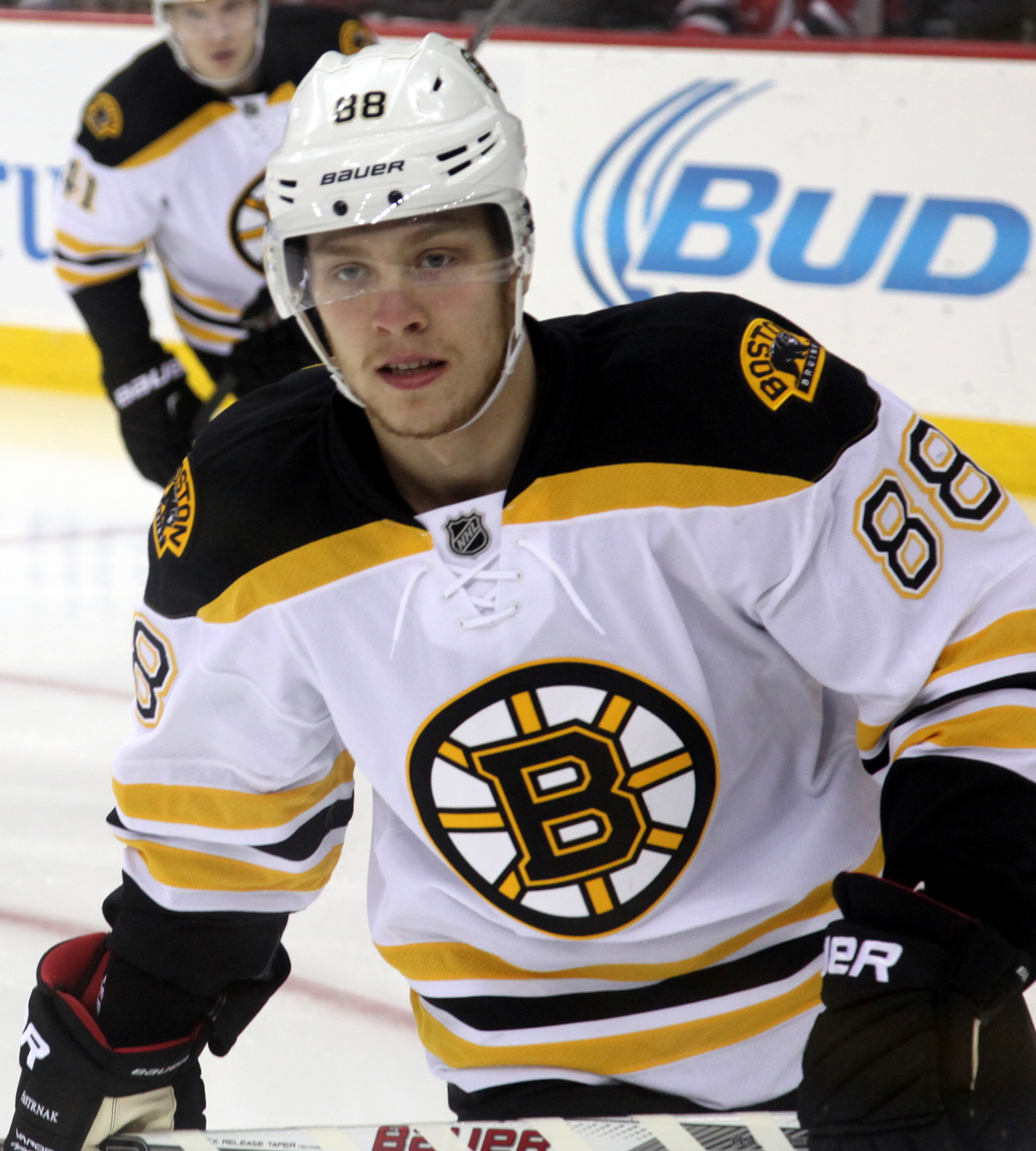
Pastrňák with the Boston Bruins in January 2016.

During a Bruins' regular season home game in the 2015–16 season, against the Penguins on 24 February 2016, Pastrňák became the youngest Bruins' player ever to score a penalty shot goal, which he scored only four minutes into the game, as the first goal en route to a 5–1 Bruins' defeat of the Penguins. His popularity in Boston has led to Bruins' fans giving him the nickname "Pasta".

==== Uprise to stardom, Run to the Stanley Cup Final, "Perfection line" era (2016–2023) ====
On 28 October 2016, Pastrňák was suspended two games for an illegal check to the head of New York Rangers defenceman Dan Girardi. The 2016–17 season proved to be a breakout year for Pastrňák, who recorded 34 goals and 36 assists for 70 points in 75 contests to lead the Bruins in scoring while playing on the first line with Brad Marchand and Patrice Bergeron, which became known as the "Perfection Line" by media outlets. Additionally, Pastrňák scored two goals and four points for the team during the 2017 playoffs where the Bruins would lose to the Ottawa Senators in six games.

Entering the 2017 off-season, Pastrňák was a restricted free agent. On 14 September 2017, the Bruins re-signed Pastrňák to a six-year, $40 million contract extension worth $6.7 million annually. Towards the end of the 2017–18 season, on 13 March 2018, Pastrňák scored his first NHL hat-trick during a come-from-behind 6–4 Bruins' road win over the Carolina Hurricanes. On 14 April, Pastrňák recorded another hat-trick along with three assists in a 7–3 home win over the Toronto Maple Leafs in game 2 of the Bruins' first-round series during the 2018 playoffs. He also became the youngest player in NHL history to score six points in a single playoff game beating Wayne Gretzky's record. The Bruins defeated the Maple Leafs in seven games but lost to the top seeded Tampa Bay Lightning in five games in the second round.

During the 2018–19 season, Pastrňák played in his first NHL Winter Classic against the Chicago Blackhawks, scoring a goal to help the team win 4–2. On 2 January, it was announced Pastrňák would appear in his first National Hockey League All-Star Game. On 16 January 2019, in a game against the Philadelphia Flyers, Pastrňák became the all-time leader for most goals in Boston Bruins history before the age of 23 passing Barry Pederson. Pastrňák won the 2019 NHL All-Star Skills Competition Accuracy Shooting hitting five targets in 11.309 seconds. On 31 January, in a game against the Philadelphia Flyers, Pastrňák scored two goals including his 30th of the season becoming the first player in Bruins history to record three 30+ goal seasons before the age of 23 passing the two of Bobby Orr, Cam Neely and Barry Pederson. However, after recording 66 points so far that season, Pastrňák injured a tendon in his left thumb, and was listed to be out for two weeks. By March 19, Pastrňák's left thumb tendon had healed enough for his return to play, and by his fifth game back from being sidelined, on March 27 he scored his third career hat-trick, his latest coming against the New York Rangers with two assists in setting a career-high five-point night; on the way to a 6–3 Bruins home ice victory. In the 2019 playoffs, Pastrnak and the Bruins would eventually go on to the Stanley Cup Finals in which the Bruins lost in seven games to the St. Louis Blues, one win short from winning the Stanley Cup.

On 14 October 2019, Pastrňák scored all four Bruins goals in a victory over the Anaheim Ducks, making him the 25th player in Bruins history to score four goals in one game. In the 2019–20 NHL season (which ended three weeks earlier than planned due to the COVID-19 pandemic, Pastrňák finished with 48 goals tied with Washington Capitals forward and captain Alexander Ovechkin for most goals in the NHL making him the first Bruins player to win the Maurice "Rocket" Richard Trophy since it was created in 1999.

During the pandemic shortened 2020–21 season, Pastrňák scored 20 goals to give him a career regular-season total of exactly 200 by the second to last game of the season on 8 May 2021 against the New York Rangers. In the first game in the second round of the 2021 playoffs, he scored a hat trick against the New York Islanders to help give the Bruins a 1–0 series lead on 29 May. Pastrňák and the Bruins would ultimately be defeated in six games by the Islanders.

In the midst of an historic 2022–23 season, Pastrňák signed a $90 million, eight-year contract extension with the team on 2 March 2023. He finished the season with a career-best 61 goals, 52 assists and 113 points in all 82 games, second in the league in the former (only behind Edmonton Oilers forward and captain Connor McDavid's 64 goals and tied for third in the latter (only behind Connor McDavid's 153 and Tampa Bay Lightning forward Nikita Kucherov's 113, respectively. The Bruins won the Presidents' Trophy as the best team of the regular season, breaking the league record for both wins and standing points. Pastrňák was widely cited as the highlight player of the team, and was for the first time named a finalist for both the Ted Lindsay Award, voted by the National Hockey League Players' Association for the league's most outstanding player, and the Hart Memorial Trophy, voted by the Professional Hockey Writers' Association for the league's most valuable player.

==== Continued individual success, team struggles (2023–2026) ====
Pastrňák looked to continue his offensive production from the previous year in the 2023–24 season, and he did just that. In the Bruins opening game against the Chicago Blackhawks, Pastrňák scored two goals to lead the Bruins to a 3–1 victory. Pastrňák continued throughout the year with consistent offensive production, reaching multiple milestones in the process. On 20 January 2024, Pastrňák scored his 30th goal of the season against the rival Montreal Canadiens, which was his seventh career 30-goal season, tying him with Johnny Bucyk for most in Bruins history. On 4 April, Pastrňák scored the 60th game-winning goal of his career against the Carolina Hurricanes, tying him with Ray Bourque for the fifth most in Bruins history. Pastrňák was also named to his second consecutive All-Star Game, where he was drafted by Team McDavid. He would score two goals and an assist in the semifinal against Bruins teammate Jeremy Swayman and Team MacKinnon. Pastrňák was scoreless in the championship game, which saw Team McDavid win 5–0. Pastrňák finished the 2023–24 season with 47 goals, 63 assists and 110 points in all 82 contests played. Pastrňák, like most star players, was expected to elevate his game come playoffs, but even with two goals and two assists throughout the first six games of the Bruins first-round matchup with the Toronto Maple Leafs, many expected Pastrňák to contribute more. After a game 6 loss that saw the Leafs force a decisive game 7, Bruins head coach Jim Montgomery called out Pastrňák, saying that he "needs to step up." Pastrňák responded by scoring the series-winning goal in overtime in game 7, and advancing the Bruins to the second round of the 2024 playoffs and a rematch with the Panthers, where they would lose in six games.

Pastrňák and the Bruins once again entered the season with high expectations in 2024–25. Unfortunately, although Pastrňák would exceed these expectations, the Bruins did not. Pastrňák once broke the forty-goal, 100-point mark on an abysmal Bruins team. It was his third season in a row reaching the 100-point total, becoming the first Czech-born player to accomplish the feat. He also became the third Bruins player to do so as well, joing team legends Bobby Orr and Phil Esposito. It was also his fifth season scoring 40+ goals, tying him with Rick Middleton for second-most in Bruins history. Pastrňák also recorded two hat-tricks during the season to add to his career total, which stood at 19 at season's end, the second most in Bruins history, and seven behind Esposito. After the deadline, with captain Brad Marchand was traded and defenseman Charlie McAvoy recovering from a long-term injury, Pastrňák became the only Bruins player on the ice to wear a letter on his sweater, wearing the alternate captain patch, and essentially serving as the "de facto" leader on the team. The trade of Marchand also made Pastrňák the longest tenured Bruin, as well as the longest tenured Boston athlete, as he had been with the team since 2014. Arguably the most impressive feat of Pastrňák's season came late, with the Bruins all but surely out of the playoff picture, Pastrňák did not slack off or give up. In five games between 1 and 8 April 2025, Pastrňák either scored or assisted on 13 consecutive Bruins goals, the longest such streak in Bruins history, and tied for the third longest streak in league history. It was only the fifth time in NHL history that a player had a streak that long, and Pastrňák joined legends of the game Jaromír Jágr, Mario Lemieux, and Wayne Gretzky as the only players to ever accomplish such a feat. Pastrňák finished the season on a 10-game point streak, recording nine goals and 13 assists in that time. Pastrňák's high level of play on a lackluster Bruins team had many people believing that he should be given strong consideration for the Hart Memorial Trophy. He ended the season with 43 goals and 63 assists for 106 points, leading the Bruins in all categories and tying him for third in the league for points, and an outright seventh in assists.

During the 2025–26 season, Pastrňák joined Bobby Orr and Ken Hodge as the only three players in Bruins history to record six assists in a game following a 10–2 win against the New York Rangers on 10 January 2026. Despite a slight decline in goal-scoring in March, Pastrňák continued to dish out assists during an eight-game goal drought, uncharacteristic for him. However, after breaking the drought against the Pittsburgh Penguins on March 8, Pastrňák got back in the groove, scoring four goals goals and six assists over six games. On March 16, Pastrňák opened the scoring in a game against the New Jersey Devils, registering his 80th point of the season. The point gave him the seventh 80-point season of his career, joining Jaromír Jágr as the only Czech players with the accomplishment. For the rest of the season, Pastrňák continued to establish himself as an elite point-scorer, but in a different way, registering a career high 71 assists in the season, and only 29 goals, which was his lowest total in a complete season since his sophomore campaign in 2015–16. In the final game of the regular season, Pastrňak registered his 100th point of the season, his fourth straight. Pastrňák would also help the Bruins return to the playoffs after missing them the season prior, playing the Buffalo Sabres in the first round. Despite scoring three goals and four assists in six games, including an overtime winner in Game 5 to extend the series, the Bruins fell to the Sabres in six games. After the series loss, Pastrňák acknowledged his age and the Bruins lack of playoff success during his tenure, saying "I'm turning 30 in a couple of weeks, so, had one sniff at the Cup so far, and yeah, it's getting harder every single year."

===== Captaincy (2026–present) =====
On 27 September 2026, Pastrňák was named the 28th captain in Bruins history, and the first since the departure of Brad Marchand during the 2024–25 season. With the announcement, Pastrňak also became just the seventh Czech-born captain in NHL history, and the second European captain in Bruins history, following former teammate Zdeno Chára.

== International play ==
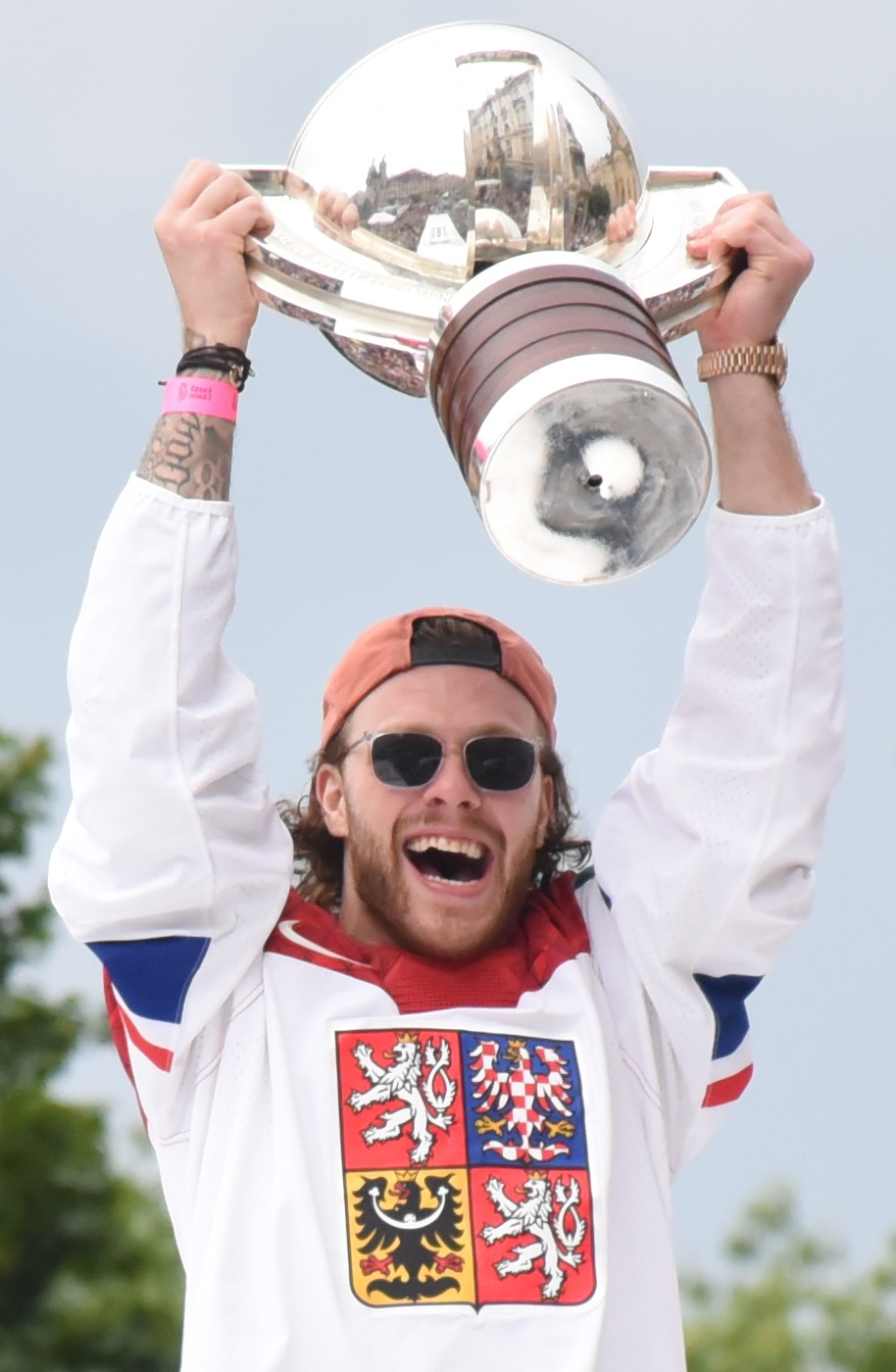
- Pastrňák with the 2024 World Championship trophy

Medal record

Men's ice hockey

Representing the Czech Republic

World Championships
Gold medal – first place	2024 Czech Republic	
Bronze medal – third place	2022 Finland	

World U18 Championships
Silver medal – second place	2014 Finland	

Ivan Hlinka Memorial Tournament
Bronze medal – third place	2013 Slovakia/Czech Republic	

Pastrňák has represented the Czech Republic's national teams at every level and has led his team in scoring numerous times. He won bronze at the 2013 Ivan Hlinka Memorial Tournament and in 2014 he won silver at the 2014 World U18 Championships. In 2016, he joined the Czech Republic senior team for the first time at the 2016 World Championship where the team finished fifth. He also represented the Czech Republic at the 2016 World Cup of Hockey.

Following the Bruins' defeat by the Tampa Bay Lightning in the second round of the 2018 playoffs, Pastrňák was invited to participate at the 2018 World Championship.

He played at the 2024 World Championship with the Czech Republic and won a gold medal, scored the winning goal in the final and was also named player of the game.

On 28 April 2025, after much speculation about his participation, it was announced Pastrňák would once again join the Czech Republic for the 2025 World Championship. Although the Czech team was eliminated in the quarterfinals of the playoff round, Pastrňák led the tournament in scoring with six goals and nine assists in eight games, being named the best forward at the tournament, as well as to the tournament all-star team.

On 16 June 2025, it was announced that Pastrňák was one of the first six players named to represent the Czech Republic at the 2026 Winter Olympics, marking the first time he will represent the team at the Olympic stage. Pastrňák was one of two Czech flag bearers at the opening ceremony, the other being Lucie Charvátová.

== Personal life ==
Pastrňák married Rebecca Rohlsson in 2024. They had a son, Viggo Rohl Pastrňák, who died in June 2021 at six days old. They have two daughters, born in June 2023 and March 2026.

== Career statistics ==
=== Regular season and playoffs ===
Bold indicates led league

			Regular season					Playoffs
Season	Team	League	GP	G	A	Pts	PIM	GP	G	A	Pts	PIM
2011–12	HC AZ Havířov 2010	CZE U16	8	11	3	14	2	—	—	—	—	—
2011–12	HC AZ Havířov 2010	CZE U18	9	**8**	13	**21**	20	—	—	—	—	—
2011–12	HC AZ Havířov 2010	CZE-2 U20	3	0	1	1	2	—	—	—	—	—
2011–12	HC AZ Havířov 2010	CZE-3	2	0	0	0	0	2	0	0	0	0
2011–12	HC Oceláři Třinec	CZE U18	31	**33**	14	**47**	6	—	—	—	—	—
2012–13	Södertälje SK	J18	5	5	8	13	4	—	—	—	—	—
2012–13	Södertälje SK	J18 Allsv	2	1	0	1	0	—	—	—	—	—
2012–13	Södertälje SK	J20	36	12	17	29	67	4	2	2	4	10
2012–13	Södertälje SK	Allsv	11	2	1	3	0	5	0	0	0	0
2013–14	Södertälje SK	J20	1	1	1	2	0	2	0	0	0	0
2013–14	Södertälje SK	Allsv	36	8	16	24	24	—	—	—	—	—
2014–15	Providence Bruins	AHL	25	11	17	28	12	3	0	0	0	0
2014–15	Boston Bruins	NHL	46	10	17	27	8	—	—	—	—	—
2015–16	Boston Bruins	NHL	51	15	11	26	20	—	—	—	—	—
2015–16	Providence Bruins	AHL	3	1	3	4	2	—	—	—	—	—
2016–17	Boston Bruins	NHL	75	34	36	70	34	6	2	2	4	6
2017–18	Boston Bruins	NHL	82	35	45	80	37	12	6	14	20	8
2018–19	Boston Bruins	NHL	66	38	43	81	32	24	9	10	19	4
2019–20	Boston Bruins	NHL	70	**48**	47	95	40	10	3	7	10	2
2020–21	Boston Bruins	NHL	48	20	28	48	24	11	7	8	15	8
2021–22	Boston Bruins	NHL	72	40	37	77	20	7	3	3	6	2
2022–23	Boston Bruins	NHL	82	61	52	113	38	7	5	0	5	2
2023–24	Boston Bruins	NHL	82	47	63	110	47	13	4	4	8	25
2024–25	Boston Bruins	NHL	82	43	63	106	42	—	—	—	—	—
2025–26	Boston Bruins	NHL	77	29	71	100	72	6	3	4	7	8
NHL totals			833	420	513	933	414	96	42	52	94	65

=== International ===
Bold indicates led tournament

Year	Team	Event	Result	GP	G	A	Pts	PIM
2012	Czech Republic	U17	8th	5	0	1	1	0
2013	Czech Republic	U18	7th	5	1	1	2	4
2013	Czech Republic	IH18	3rd place, bronze medalist(s)	4	2	2	4	2
2014	Czech Republic	WJC	6th	5	1	2	3	0
2014	Czech Republic	U18	2nd place, silver medalist(s)	7	0	5	5	2
2015	Czech Republic	WJC	6th	5	1	6	7	4
2016	Czech Republic	WJC	5th	4	1	3	4	0
2016	Czech Republic	WC	5th	8	1	5	6	4
2016	Czech Republic	WCH	6th	3	0	0	0	0
2017	Czech Republic	WC	7th	8	1	6	7	4
2018	Czech Republic	WC	7th	5	4	2	6	0
2022	Czechia	WC	3rd place, bronze medalist(s)	7	**7**	3	10	2
2024	Czechia	WC	1st place, gold medalist(s)	4	1	0	1	2
2025	Czechia	WC	6th	8	6	9	**15**	4
2026	Czechia	OG	8th	5	2	3	5	0
Junior totals				35	6	20	26	12
Senior totals				48	22	28	50	16

== Awards, honours and records ==
Award	Year	Ref
Czech Republic
Golden Hockey Stick	2017, 2018, 2019, 2020, 2021, 2023, 2024, 2025	
Sportsperson of the Year	2020	
AHL
AHL Rookie of the Month (October)	2015	
AHL All-Star Game	2015	
NHL
NHL All-Star Game	2019, 2020, 2023, 2024	
NHL All-Star Skills Competition Accuracy Shooting Winner	2019	
NHL All-Star Game MVP	2020	
Maurice "Rocket" Richard Trophy	2020	
NHL First All-Star Team	2020, 2023	
NHL Second All-Star Team	2024, 2025, 2026	
International
World Junior Championship Top 3 Player on Team	2015, 2016	
World Championship Top 3 Player on Team	2018, 2025	
World Championship Best Forward	2025	
World Championship All-Star Team	2025	
Boston Bruins
Seventh Player Award	2015, 2017	
Eddie Shore Award	2017	
John P. Bucyk Award	2017	
Bruins Three Stars Awards	2019, 2020, 2022, 2023, 2024, 2025, 2026	
Elizabeth C. Dufresne Trophy	2020, 2022, 2024, 2025	
Named One of Top 100 Best Bruins Players of all Time	2024	
Boston Bruins All-Centennial Team	2024	

- Elected Atlantic Division captain of the 2020 National Hockey League All-Star Game.

=== Records ===
==== NHL ====
- Youngest player in NHL history to record six points in a single playoff game (21 years and 324 days) – 14 April 2018
- Most points accumulated in the first two games of a postseason in NHL history – 9 tied with Phil Esposito.
- First and only Czech-born player in NHL history to record 4 consecutive 100-point seasons.

==== Boston Bruins ====
- Youngest player in franchise history to score an overtime, game-winning goal in regular season play – 29 March 2015
- Youngest player to ever score a penalty shot goal – 24 February 2016
- Youngest player to score 30 goals in regular season – 20 years and 291 days
- Most goals in franchise history before the age of 23.
- Most 30+ goal seasons before the age of 23 in franchise history.
- First and only player in franchise history to record three 30+ goal seasons before the age of 23.
- First and only player in Bruins history to score all of his team's 4 goals of a game.
- First and only player in Bruins history to win the Maurice "Rocket" Richard Trophy.
- Most consecutive goals factored on – 13
- Most assists in one game by a Bruin player – 6 tied with Bobby Orr and Ken Hodge.

==== Czech Republic ====
- Youngest player in history to win the Golden Stick Award – 21 years and 27 days.
- Most consecutive Golden Hockey Stick Award wins – 5

Awards and achievements
Preceded by Malcolm Subban	Boston Bruins first-round draft pick 2014	Succeeded by Jakub Zbořil
Preceded by Alexander Ovechkin	Maurice "Rocket" Richard Trophy winner 2020; With: Alexander Ovechkin	Succeeded by Auston Matthews
Preceded by Lukáš Krpálek	Czech Athlete of the Year; 2020	Succeeded by Lukáš Krpálek
Sporting positions
Preceded by Brad Marchand	Boston Bruins captain 2026–present	Incumbent
Olympic Games
Preceded by Michal Březina; Alena Mills	Flagbearer for Czech Republic; Milano Cortina 2026 with Lucie Charvátová	Succeeded by incumbent
