= 2023 National Hockey League All-Star Game =

Professional ice hockey exhibition game

2023 NHL All-Star Game

FLA Live Arena, Sunrise
- February 4, 2023
- Game one: Central 6 – Pacific 4
- Game two: Atlantic 10 – Metropolitan 6
- Game three: Atlantic 7 – Central 5
- MVP: Matthew Tkachuk (Atlantic)

The 2023 National Hockey League All-Star Game was held on February 4, 2023, at FLA Live Arena in Sunrise, the home of the Florida Panthers. For the seventh consecutive All-Star Game, a three-on-three format was used, with teams representing each of the league's four divisions competing in a single-elimination tournament. This was the 67th edition of the game.

== History ==
The NHL originally awarded Sunrise, the 2021 All-Star Game on January 24, 2020. The city previously hosted the NHL All-Star Game in 2003.

On October 22, 2020, the NHL announced that the All-Star Game had been postponed for the 2020–21 season due to the COVID-19 pandemic and "uncertainty as to when we will be able to welcome our fans back to our games," as fan participation and accompanying events are considered "integral to the[ir] success". The NHL stated that the event could be held in Florida "in the near future" (but not yet naming them the 2022 hosts).

On June 28, 2021, the league instead announced that the 2022 All-Star Game would take place at T-Mobile Arena in Las Vegas, home of the Vegas Golden Knights. On February 4, 2022, the league confirmed that Florida would host the 2023 game.

== Skills Competition ==
The NHL All-Star Skills Competition was held on February 3. The Accuracy Shooting, Breakaway Challenge, Fastest Skater, and Hardest Shot events returned for another year.

The winners of these four regular skills events were:

- Fastest Skater: Andrei Svechnikov, Carolina Hurricanes (13.699 seconds)
- Hardest Shot: Elias Pettersson, Vancouver Canucks (103.2 mph)
- Breakaway Challenge: Sidney Crosby (Pittsburgh Penguins), Alexander Ovechkin (Washington Capitals), and Sergei Ovechkin (40)
- Accuracy Shooting: Brock Nelson, New York Islanders (12.419 seconds)

Replacing the Save Streak event was a new goaltender competition called Tendy Tandem, featuring both goalies from each division. The event split the goalies from each division, with one shooting across the ice to score a goal on net, and the other (depending on the points earned by the other goalie) then facing 1, 2, or 3 players in a breakaway shootout, which included members of the Canadian and American women's national hockey teams; during the event, Team Canada's Sarah Nurse scored a goal against New York Rangers goaltender Igor Shesterkin. The event was ultimately won by the Central Division tandem of Connor Hellebuyck (Winnipeg Jets) and Juuse Saros (Nashville Predators), who finished with 13 points.

The Skills Competition also features two events specific to Florida locations:

- Splash Shot event took place on a Fort Lauderdale beach and featured players hitting pucks at targets. If all the targets were hit, then the player could attempt to hit a puck at a dunk tank, trying to dunk an opponent. The winners of the challenge were Cale Makar and Mikko Rantanen of the Colorado Avalanche, knocking down all the targets in 18.7 seconds.
- Pitch 'n Puck took place at Plantation Preserve Golf Course & Club in Plantation. The event had players on a par-4 golf hole, attempting to sink a puck in the hole. The event was won by Nick Suzuki of the Montreal Canadiens, who finished with a birdie.

== Rosters ==
For the 2023 game, the player selection process was performed in two stages. On January 5, the league's Department of Hockey Operations selected 32 players, one for each team. The remaining 12 players were decided by fan vote, which ran from January 5 to January 17, with fans voting in three players (two skaters and one goalie) for each division.

On January 11, the head coaches were announced, chosen from the team in each division with the highest points percentage through January 11: Rod Brind'Amour of the Carolina Hurricanes (Metropolitan), Jim Montgomery of the Boston Bruins (Atlantic), Peter DeBoer of the Dallas Stars (Central), and Bruce Cassidy of the Vegas Golden Knights (Pacific).

=== Eastern Conference ===
Atlantic Division
Head coach: (Canada) Jim Montgomery, Boston Bruins
Nat.	Player	Team	Pos.	#
(Finland)	Aleksander Barkov*	Florida Panthers	F	16
(Russia)	Nikita Kucherov	Tampa Bay Lightning	F	86
(United States)	Dylan Larkin	Detroit Red Wings	F	71
(Canada)	Mitch Marner	Toronto Maple Leafs	F	16
(Czech Republic)	David Pastrnak (Note: Fan vote winners)	Boston Bruins	F	88
(Canada)	Nick Suzuki	Montreal Canadiens	F	14
(United States)	Brady Tkachuk	Ottawa Senators	F	7
(United States)	Matthew Tkachuk	Florida Panthers	F	19
(Sweden)	Rasmus Dahlin^{#}	Buffalo Sabres	D	26
(Sweden)	Linus Ullmark	Boston Bruins	G	35
(Russia)	Andrei Vasilevskiy	Tampa Bay Lightning	G	88

- ^{*} Replaced Auston Matthews (Toronto Maple Leafs) due to injury.
- ^{#} Replaced Tage Thompson (Buffalo Sabres) due to injury.

Metropolitan Division
Head coach: (Canada) Rod Brind'Amour, Carolina Hurricanes
Nat.	Player	Team	Pos.	#
(Canada)	Sidney Crosby	Pittsburgh Penguins	F	87
(United States)	Johnny Gaudreau	Columbus Blue Jackets	F	13
(United States)	Kevin Hayes	Philadelphia Flyers	F	13
(United States)	Jack Hughes	New Jersey Devils	F	86
(United States)	Brock Nelson	New York Islanders	F	29
(Russia)	Alex Ovechkin	Washington Capitals	F	8
(Russia)	Artemi Panarin	New York Rangers	F	10
(Russia)	Andrei Svechnikov	Carolina Hurricanes	F	37
(United States)	Adam Fox	New York Rangers	D	23
(Russia)	Ilya Sorokin	New York Islanders	G	30
(Russia)	Igor Shesterkin	New York Rangers	G	31

=== Western Conference ===
Central Division
Head coach: (Canada) Peter DeBoer, Dallas Stars
Nat.	Player	Team	Pos.	#
(Russia)	Kirill Kaprizov	Minnesota Wild	F	97
(United States)	Clayton Keller	Arizona Coyotes	F	9
(Canada)	Nathan MacKinnon	Colorado Avalanche	F	29
(Finland)	Mikko Rantanen	Colorado Avalanche	F	96
(United States)	Jason Robertson	Dallas Stars	F	21
(Russia)	Vladimir Tarasenko	St. Louis Blues	F	91
(United States)	Seth Jones	Chicago Blackhawks	D	4
(Canada)	Cale Makar	Colorado Avalanche	D	8
(Canada)	Josh Morrissey	Winnipeg Jets	D	44
(United States)	Connor Hellebuyck	Winnipeg Jets	G	37
(Finland)	Juuse Saros	Nashville Predators	G	74

Pacific Division
Head coach: (Canada) Bruce Cassidy, Vegas Golden Knights
Nat.	Player	Team	Pos.	#
(Germany)	Leon Draisaitl	Edmonton Oilers	F	29
(Switzerland)	Kevin Fiala	Los Angeles Kings	F	22
(Canada)	Bo Horvat	New York Islanders (Note: Horvat was originally voted into the All-Star Game as a member of the Vancouver Canucks, before being traded to the New York Islanders on January 30, 2023. The league announced that Horvat would represent the Islanders at All-Star events, but still play for the Pacific Division.)	F	14
(Canada)	Nazem Kadri	Calgary Flames	F	91
(Canada)	Connor McDavid	Edmonton Oilers	F	97
(Sweden)	Elias Pettersson	Vancouver Canucks	F	40
(Canada)	Chandler Stephenson*	Vegas Golden Knights	F	20
(United States)	Troy Terry	Anaheim Ducks	F	19
(Sweden)	Erik Karlsson	San Jose Sharks	D	65
(Canada)	Stuart Skinner	Edmonton Oilers	G	74
(Canada)	Logan Thompson	Vegas Golden Knights	G	36

- ^{*} Replaced Matty Beniers (Seattle Kraken) due to injury.

== Bracket ==
Semifinals		Final
Pacific Division	4
Central Division	6	Central Division	5
Metropolitan Division	6	Atlantic Division	7
Atlantic Division	10

== Game summaries ==
Each game was played in abbreviated format, consisting of two 10-minute periods of 3-on-3 play.

=== First semifinal game ===
February 4, 2023	Pacific	4–6	Central	FLA Live Arena	Recap
03:48 – Connor McDavid (1); 07:55 – Elias Pettersson (1)		First period	Nathan MacKinnon (1) – 03:15; Seth Jones (1) – 06:52; Nathan MacKinnon (2) – 08:38
06:22 – Elias Pettersson (2); 07:27 – Erik Karlsson (1)		Second period	Clayton Keller (1) – 00:18; Vladimir Tarasenko (1) – 05:32; Clayton Keller (2) – 08:07
No period		Third period	No period
Logan Thompson 4 saves / 7 shots Stuart Skinner 4 saves / 7 shots		Goalie stats	Juuse Saros 11 saves / 13 shots Connor Hellebuyck 7 saves / 9 shots

=== Second semifinal game ===
February 4, 2023	Metropolitan	6–10	Atlantic	FLA Live Arena	Recap
05:20 – Johnny Gaudreau (1); 05:40 – Johnny Gaudreau (2); 06:19 – Sidney Crosby (1)		First period	Matthew Tkachuk (1) – 00:36; Dylan Larkin (1) – 04:08; Brady Tkachuk (1) – 06:59; Nick Suzuki (1) – 07:55
00:25 – Johnny Gaudreau (3); 01:58 – Sidney Crosby (2); 02:21 – Alexander Ovechkin (1)		Second period	Matthew Tkachuk (2) – 03:39; Nikita Kucherov (1) – 04:31; Nick Suzuki (2) – 05:51; Matthew Tkachuk (3) – 06:49; Dylan Larkin (2) – en – 09:00; David Pastrnak (1) – 9:47
No period		Third period	No period
Ilya Sorokin 8 saves / 13 shots Igor Shesterkin 5 saves / 9 shots		Goalie stats	Linus Ullmark 4 saves / 7 shots Andrei Vasilevskiy 10 saves / 13 shots

=== Final ===
February 4, 2023	Central	5–7	Atlantic	FLA Live Arena	Recap
No scoring		First period	Matthew Tkachuk (4) – 00:37; Nikita Kucherov (2) – 04:05; Dylan Larkin (3) – 09:17
04:09 – Mikko Rantanen (1); 08:47 – Jason Robertson (1); 09:07 – Clayton Keller (3); 09:39 – Nathan MacKinnon (3); 09:52 – Cale Makar (1)		Second period	Dylan Larkin (4) – 02:03; David Pastrnak (2) – 07:14; Dylan Larkin (5) – 08:54; Rasmus Dahlin (1) – 09:25
No period		Third period	No period
Juuse Saros 11 saves / 14 shots Connor Hellebuyck 7 saves / 11 shots		Goalie stats	Linus Ullmark 6 saves / 6 shots Andrei Vasilevskiy 11 saves / 16 shots

== Uniforms ==
The All-Star uniforms were unveiled on January 19. For the first time since 2009, conference logos are featured on the jersey crests, with each player's respective team logo on the left shoulder and the All-Star Game logo on the right. The jerseys are part of the league's "Reverse Retro" program, based on the same design as those used from 1994 to 1997; however, they were recolored in black, teal, and pink, reflecting the South Florida setting of the game. Like the remainder of the Reverse Retro jerseys in 2022–23, the NHL logo at the collar was colored orange instead of silver.

In the semifinals, the Pacific and Metropolitan teams wore white over teal against their opponents, the Central and Atlantic teams, respectively, who wore black over white. In the final, the Atlantic team stayed in their black jerseys while the Central team switched to white.

== Festivities and entertainment ==
The Truly Hard Seltzer NHL All-Star Beach Festival, featured various fan activities during All-Star Weekend, held between February 2 and February 4 at the Fort Lauderdale Beach Park.

The NHL announced on January 20 that American pop punk rock band Fall Out Boy would perform at the All-Star Game. The performance took place during the second intermission.

Canadian country singer SACHA sang the Canadian national anthem while singer-songwriter Andrew McMahon sang the American national anthem.

== Television ==
The All-Star Game and Skills Competition were broadcast in the United States by ABC and ESPN, respectively. Both events were also streamed in the U.S. on ESPN+. In Canada, both the All-Star Game and Skills Competition were broadcast in English on Sportsnet and on TVA Sports in French. The All-Star Game was also streamed in Canada on Sportsnet Now. After a one-year hiatus due to the 2022 Winter Olympics, CBC rejoined Sportsnet in simulcasting both events.
