= 2020 National Hockey League All-Star Game =

Professional ice hockey exhibition game

2020 NHL All–Star Game

Enterprise Center, St. Louis
- January 25, 2020
- Game one: Atlantic 9 – Metropolitan 5
- Game two: Pacific 10 – Central 5
- Game three: Pacific 5 – Atlantic 4
- MVP: David Pastrnak (Atlantic)

The 2020 National Hockey League All-Star Game was held on January 25, 2020, at the Enterprise Center in St. Louis, the home of the St. Louis Blues. The city previously hosted the NHL All-Star Game in 1970 and 1988 at the former St. Louis Arena. For the fifth year, the All-Star Game used a 3-on-3 format, with teams representing each of the league's four divisions competing in a single-elimination tournament.

The Pacific All-Stars won the All-Star Game after defeating the Atlantic All-Stars in the final, 5–4. David Pastrnak of the Boston Bruins, representing the Atlantic, was named the Most Valuable Player after recording a total of four goals and two assists over the course of both the Atlantic's 9–5 semifinal win over the Metropolitan team and their loss in the final to the Pacific team.

== Skills Competition ==
External videos
- 2020 All-Star Skills Competition
- Full replay (NBCSN's feed) on the NHL's official YouTube channel
- Fastest Skater (Sportsnet's feed) on Sportsnet's official YouTube channel
- Save Streak (Sportsnet's feed) on Sportsnet's official YouTube channel
- Accuracy Shooting (Sportsnet's feed) on Sportsnet's official YouTube channel
- Hardest Shot (Sportsnet's feed) on Sportsnet's official YouTube channel
- Shooting Stars (Sportsnet's feed) on Sportsnet's official YouTube channel

The NHL All-Star Skills Competition was held on the night before on January 24. The Fastest Skater, Save Streak, Accuracy Shooting, and Hardest Shot events made their return. A new event, the Shooting Stars, also made its debut, featuring players shooting pucks from an elevated 30-foot (9.1 m) platform behind the goal towards targets on the ice.

The winners of the five skills events were:

- Fastest Skater: Mathew Barzal, New York Islanders
- Save Streak: Jordan Binnington, St. Louis Blues
- Accuracy Shooting: Jaccob Slavin, Carolina Hurricanes
- Hardest Shot: Shea Weber, Montreal Canadiens
- Shooting Stars: Patrick Kane, Chicago Blackhawks

=== Elite Women's 3-on-3 game ===
External videos
- Elite Women's 3-on-3 game
- NBCSN's feed on the NHL's official YouTube channel
- Sportsnet's feed on Sportsnet's official YouTube channel

January 24, 2020	Canadian All-Stars	2–1	American All-Stars	Enterprise Center
00:54 – Rebecca Johnston (1)		First period	No scoring
02:25 – Melodie Daoust (1)		Second period	Hilary Knight (1) – 04:24
No period		Third period	No period
Ann-Renee Desbiens 15 saves / 16 shots		Goalie stats	Alex Cavallini 14 saves / 16 shots

American All-Stars

- Forwards: Kendall Coyne Schofield, Brianna Decker, Amanda Kessel, Hilary Knight, Jocelyne Lamoureux, Annie Pankowski, and Alex Carpenter
- Defense: Kacey Bellamy and Lee Stecklein
- Goalie: Alex Rigsby Cavallini
- Head coach: Cammi Granato

Canadian All-Stars

- Forwards: Meghan Agosta, Melodie Daoust, Rebecca Johnston, Sarah Nurse, Marie-Philip Poulin, Natalie Spooner, and Blayre Turnbull
- Defense: Renata Fast and Laura Fortino
- Goalie: Ann-Renee Desbiens
- Head coach: Jayna Hefford

== Rosters ==
As in the previous four All-Star Games, captaincy of each division was determined by a fan vote, with the 2020 vote running from November 30 to December 20, 2019. On December 21, the four captains were announced by the NHL. Connor McDavid of the Edmonton Oilers was selected to captain the Pacific Division for the fourth straight year. Nathan MacKinnon of the Colorado Avalanche was selected for the Central Division for the second straight year (MacKinnon was selected but did not play in the 2019 game). First time captain David Pastrnak of the Boston Bruins was picked for the Atlantic Division. Alexander Ovechkin of the Washington Capitals was selected for the Metropolitan Division for the third straight year, but for the second consecutive year he has opted to abstain from the game to rest. Most of the rest of the rosters were announced on December 30. Fans were further invited from January 1 to January 10, 2020 to vote for an additional "Last Man In" player for each division. The "Last Men In" elected were Mitch Marner of the Toronto Maple Leafs (Atlantic), T. J. Oshie of the Washington Capitals (Metropolitan), David Perron of the St. Louis Blues (Central), and Quinn Hughes of the Vancouver Canucks (Pacific).

On January 3, the head coaches were announced, chosen from the team in each division with the highest points percentage through January 2, roughly the regular season's halfway point: Bruce Cassidy of the Boston Bruins (Atlantic), Todd Reirden of the Washington Capitals (Metropolitan), Craig Berube of the St. Louis Blues (Central), and Gerard Gallant of Vegas Golden Knights (Pacific). Since then, the Golden Knights fired Gallant on January 15 following the team's under-performance; the league announced one day later that his replacement in the all-star game would be Rick Tocchet of the Arizona Coyotes, who were first in Pacific on that day.

Honorary captains were also named for each of the four divisions: Actors and St. Louis natives Jon Hamm (Metropolitan) and Jenna Fischer (Atlantic), and former Blues players Brett Hull (Central) and Wayne Gretzky (Pacific).

Referees named to work the All-Star Game were Francois St-Laurent and Justin St. Pierre, and linesman Michel Cormier and Bryan Pancich.

The Anaheim Ducks were not represented by anyone due to Jakob Silfverberg, the Ducks' selection for the game, being excused for the birth of his child.

=== Eastern Conference ===
Atlantic Division
Head coach: (Canada) Bruce Cassidy, Boston Bruins
Nat.	Player	Team	Pos.	#
(Czech Republic)	David Pastrnak (C)	Boston Bruins	F	88
(Canada)	Tyler Bertuzzi	Detroit Red Wings	F	59
(Canada)	Anthony Duclair	Ottawa Senators	F	10
(United States)	Jack Eichel	Buffalo Sabres	F	9
(Canada)	Jonathan Huberdeau	Florida Panthers	F	11
(Canada)	Mitch Marner~	Toronto Maple Leafs	F	16
(United States)	Brady Tkachuk†	Ottawa Senators	F	7
(Sweden)	Victor Hedman	Tampa Bay Lightning	D	77
(Canada)	Shea Weber	Montreal Canadiens	D	6
(Denmark)	Frederik Andersen	Toronto Maple Leafs	G	31
(Russia)	Andrei Vasilevskiy‡	Tampa Bay Lightning	G	88

- ^{~} Voted "Last Man In".
- ^{†} Replaced Auston Matthews (Toronto Maple Leafs) due to injury (still attended All-Star weekend).
- ^{‡} Replaced Tuukka Rask (Boston Bruins), who opted to abstain from the game to rest.

Metropolitan Division
Head coach: (United States) Todd Reirden, Washington Capitals
Nat.	Player	Team	Pos.	#
(Canada)	Kris Letang† (C)	Pittsburgh Penguins	D	58
(Canada)	Mathew Barzal	New York Islanders	F	13
(Switzerland)	Nico Hischier‡	New Jersey Devils	F	13
(Canada)	Travis Konecny	Philadelphia Flyers	F	11
(United States)	Chris Kreider^{*}	New York Rangers	F	20
(United States)	T. J. Oshie~	Washington Capitals	F	77
(United States)	John Carlson	Washington Capitals	D	74
(United States)	Seth Jones	Columbus Blue Jackets	D	3
(United States)	Jaccob Slavin^	Carolina Hurricanes	D	74
(Canada)	Braden Holtby	Washington Capitals	G	70
(Canada)	Tristan Jarry#	Pittsburgh Penguins	G	35

- Alexander Ovechkin (C) (Washington Capitals) opted to abstain from the game to rest.
- ^{~} Voted "Last Man In".
- ^{†} Replaced Jake Guentzel (Pittsburgh Penguins) due to injury.
- ^{‡} Replaced Kyle Palmieri (New Jersey Devils) due to injury.
- ^{*} Replaced Artemi Panarin (New York Rangers) due to injury.
- ^{^} Replaced Dougie Hamilton (Carolina Hurricanes) due to injury.
- ^{#} Replaced Joonas Korpisalo (Columbus Blue Jackets) due to injury.

=== Western Conference ===
Central Division
Head coach: (Canada) Craig Berube, St. Louis Blues
Nat.	Player	Team	Pos.	#
(Canada)	Nathan MacKinnon (C)	Colorado Avalanche	F	29
(United States)	Patrick Kane	Chicago Blackhawks	F	88
(Canada)	Ryan O'Reilly	St. Louis Blues	F	90
(Canada)	David Perron~	St. Louis Blues	F	57
(Canada)	Mark Scheifele	Winnipeg Jets	F	55
(Canada)	Tyler Seguin	Dallas Stars	F	91
(Canada)	Eric Staal	Minnesota Wild	F	12
(Switzerland)	Roman Josi	Nashville Predators	D	59
(Canada)	Alex Pietrangelo	St. Louis Blues	D	27
(Canada)	Jordan Binnington	St. Louis Blues	G	50
(United States)	Connor Hellebuyck	Winnipeg Jets	G	37

- ^{~} Voted "Last Man In".

Pacific Division
Head coach: (Canada) Rick Tocchet, Arizona Coyotes¤
Nat.	Player	Team	Pos.	#
(Canada)	Connor McDavid (C)	Edmonton Oilers	F	97
(Germany)	Leon Draisaitl	Edmonton Oilers	F	29
(Czech Republic)	Tomas Hertl†	San Jose Sharks	F	48
(Slovenia)	Anze Kopitar	Los Angeles Kings	F	11
(United States)	Max Pacioretty‡	Vegas Golden Knights	F	67
(Sweden)	Elias Pettersson	Vancouver Canucks	F	40
(United States)	Matthew Tkachuk	Calgary Flames	F	19
(Canada)	Mark Giordano	Calgary Flames	D	5
(United States)	Quinn Hughes~	Vancouver Canucks	D	43
(Sweden)	Jacob Markstrom*	Vancouver Canucks	G	25
(Czech Republic)	David Rittich^	Calgary Flames	G	33

- ^{~} Voted "Last Man In".
- ^{†} Replaced Logan Couture (San Jose Sharks) due to injury.
- ^{‡} Replaced Jakob Silfverberg (Anaheim Ducks), who was excused from the game due to the birth of his child.
- ^{*} Replaced Marc-Andre Fleury (Vegas Golden Knights), who opted to abstain from the game to rest.
- ^{^} Replaced Darcy Kuemper (Arizona Coyotes) due to injury.
- ^{¤} Replaced Gerard Gallant, who was fired from the Vegas Golden Knights.

== Bracket ==
External videos
- 2020 NHL All-Star Game
- Full replay (NBC's feed) on the NHL's official YouTube channel
- Every goal of the Metropolitan vs. Atlantic Semifinal (Sportsnet's feed) on Sportsnet's official YouTube channel
- Every goal of the Pacific vs. Central Semifinal (Sportsnet's feed) on Sportsnet's official YouTube channel
- Every goal of the Pacific vs. Atlantic Final (Sportsnet's feed) on Sportsnet's official YouTube channel

Semifinals		Final
Metropolitan	5
Atlantic	9	Atlantic	4
Pacific	10	Pacific	5
Central	5

== Game summaries ==
=== First semifinal game ===
January 25, 2020	Metropolitan	5–9	Atlantic	Enterprise Center
02:13 – John Carlson (1); 03:38 – Nico Hischier (1); 05:29 – T. J. Oshie (1); 06:04 – Seth Jones (1)		First period	David Pastrnak (1) – 00:26; Shea Weber (1) – 00:49; Anthony Duclair (1) – 06:20; David Pastrnak (2) – 08:28
02:50 – Nico Hischier (2)		Second period	Jonathan Huberdeau (1) – 04:48; Victor Hedman (1) – en – 05:47; Anthony Duclair (2) – 06:07; David Pastrnak (3) – en – 09:05; Anthony Duclair (3) – en – 09:29
No period		Third period	No period
Braden Holtby 5 saves / 9 shots Tristan Jarry 8 saves / 11 shots		Goalie stats	Frederik Andersen 5 saves / 9 shots Andrei Vasilevskiy 6 saves / 7 shots

=== Second semifinal game ===
January 25, 2020	Pacific	10–5	Central	Enterprise Center
02:12 – Matthew Tkachuk (1); 02:59 – Leon Draisaitl (1); 04:42 – Tomas Hertl (1); 09:06 – Quinn Hughes (1)		First period	Mark Scheifele (1) – 05:09; David Perron (1) – 07:04; Patrick Kane (1) – 07:18; Tyler Seguin (1) – 09:39
00:46 – Leon Draisaitl (2); 02:42 – Matthew Tkachuk (2); 03:34 – Leon Draisaitl (3); 04:45 – Tomas Hertl (2); 07:06 – Tomas Hertl (3); 08:56 – Tomas Hertl (4)		Second period	Patrick Kane (2) – 01:37
No period		Third period	No period
Jacob Markstrom 3 saves / 7 shots David Rittich 9 saves / 10 shots		Goalie stats	Jordan Binnington 8 saves / 12 shots Connor Hellebuyck 10 saves / 16 shots

=== Final ===
January 25, 2020	Atlantic	4–5	Pacific	Enterprise Center
00:24 – Victor Hedman (2); 01:29 – Jonathan Huberdeau (2); 09:13 – David Pastrnak (4)		First period	Max Pacioretty (1) – 06:05
03:15 – Tyler Bertuzzi (1); 07:24 – Tomas Hertl (5)		Second period	Elias Pettersson (1) – 01:37; Leon Draisaitl (4) – 01:44; Elias Pettersson (2) – 05:04
No period		Third period	No period
Frederik Andersen 8 saves / 9 shots Andrei Vasilevskiy 7 saves / 11 shots		Goalie stats	Jacob Markstrom 4 saves / 7 shots David Rittich 3 saves / 4 shots

== Uniforms ==
The All-Star uniforms were unveiled on January 8. Like the previous season, each player's respective team logo is featured on the front, but this time they are only rendered in one team color (e.g. the Boston Bruins logo is only rendered in gold instead of black and gold). The striping patterns also added to the front and sleeves to the uniforms are meant to resemble a musical staff to honor the music of St. Louis.

== Festivities and entertainment ==
This year's NHL Fan Fair, featuring various fan activities during All-Star Weekend, was held between Thursday, January 23 and Sunday, January 26 at Union Station.

The rock band O.A.R. performed during a concert outside the Enterprise Center prior to the All-Star Skills Competition. The rock band Green Day also gave an outdoor concert prior to the All-Star Game and then performed during the second intermission.

Awolnation performed during the player introductions before the game. Blues superfan Laila Anderson introduced the Blues during player introductions. Canadian country music singer Tenille Townes sang the Canadian national anthem while retired St. Louis Blues anthem singer Charles Glenn sang the U.S. national anthem.

== Television ==
The All-Star Game and Skills Competition was broadcast in the United States by NBC and NBCSN, respectively. In Canada, both the All-Star Game and skills competition was broadcast in English on both CBC and Sportsnet (under the Hockey Night in Canada banner), and on TVA Sports in French. With the 2021 game being canceled due to the COVID-19 pandemic, which would force the NHL to suspend the remainder of the season, this was the last All-Star Game to air on NBC.

As with the 2019 All-Star Game, the league continued testing its new player and puck tracking systems. The league had planned to deploy this technology to all 31 NHL arenas prior to the start of the season, but a change to its primary technology partner has delayed full league-wide implementation until the playoffs.

The league also experimented with its digitally enhanced dasherboards, first used at the 2016 World Cup of Hockey, for the digital replacement of advertising on the rink boards on selected camera shots. Nine localized feeds were available (expanded from four during the World Cup), including Canada English, Canada French, the United States, as well as the Czech Republic and Slovakia, Finland, Russia, Sweden, Switzerland, and world feeds. The goal is to eventually deploy this technology for all NHL telecasts, for the benefit of its national and regional broadcasters.
